

518001–518100 

|-bgcolor=#d6d6d6
| 518001 ||  || — || July 3, 2014 || Haleakala || Pan-STARRS ||  || align=right | 3.0 km || 
|-id=002 bgcolor=#d6d6d6
| 518002 ||  || — || September 23, 2015 || Haleakala || Pan-STARRS ||  || align=right | 2.4 km || 
|-id=003 bgcolor=#d6d6d6
| 518003 ||  || — || October 14, 2004 || Kitt Peak || Spacewatch ||  || align=right | 2.7 km || 
|-id=004 bgcolor=#d6d6d6
| 518004 ||  || — || October 12, 2005 || Kitt Peak || Spacewatch ||  || align=right | 1.9 km || 
|-id=005 bgcolor=#E9E9E9
| 518005 ||  || — || September 20, 2006 || Catalina || CSS ||  || align=right | 1.5 km || 
|-id=006 bgcolor=#d6d6d6
| 518006 ||  || — || October 29, 2010 || Mount Lemmon || Mount Lemmon Survey ||  || align=right | 2.7 km || 
|-id=007 bgcolor=#E9E9E9
| 518007 ||  || — || July 17, 2010 || Siding Spring || SSS ||  || align=right | 1.8 km || 
|-id=008 bgcolor=#fefefe
| 518008 ||  || — || March 22, 2014 || Mount Lemmon || Mount Lemmon Survey ||  || align=right | 1.0 km || 
|-id=009 bgcolor=#d6d6d6
| 518009 ||  || — || May 28, 2008 || Mount Lemmon || Mount Lemmon Survey ||  || align=right | 2.6 km || 
|-id=010 bgcolor=#d6d6d6
| 518010 ||  || — || June 7, 2008 || Kitt Peak || Spacewatch ||  || align=right | 2.5 km || 
|-id=011 bgcolor=#d6d6d6
| 518011 ||  || — || January 23, 2006 || Kitt Peak || Spacewatch ||  || align=right | 2.5 km || 
|-id=012 bgcolor=#E9E9E9
| 518012 ||  || — || May 7, 2014 || Haleakala || Pan-STARRS ||  || align=right | 2.3 km || 
|-id=013 bgcolor=#d6d6d6
| 518013 ||  || — || October 7, 2004 || Kitt Peak || Spacewatch ||  || align=right | 2.6 km || 
|-id=014 bgcolor=#d6d6d6
| 518014 ||  || — || September 14, 2009 || Catalina || CSS ||  || align=right | 3.7 km || 
|-id=015 bgcolor=#E9E9E9
| 518015 ||  || — || December 31, 2011 || Kitt Peak || Spacewatch ||  || align=right | 2.0 km || 
|-id=016 bgcolor=#d6d6d6
| 518016 ||  || — || July 26, 2014 || Haleakala || Pan-STARRS ||  || align=right | 3.0 km || 
|-id=017 bgcolor=#d6d6d6
| 518017 ||  || — || June 24, 2014 || Haleakala || Pan-STARRS ||  || align=right | 2.7 km || 
|-id=018 bgcolor=#d6d6d6
| 518018 ||  || — || September 20, 2009 || Mount Lemmon || Mount Lemmon Survey ||  || align=right | 2.8 km || 
|-id=019 bgcolor=#d6d6d6
| 518019 ||  || — || October 29, 1999 || Kitt Peak || Spacewatch || EOS || align=right | 1.8 km || 
|-id=020 bgcolor=#E9E9E9
| 518020 ||  || — || April 11, 2010 || Mount Lemmon || Mount Lemmon Survey ||  || align=right | 1.1 km || 
|-id=021 bgcolor=#d6d6d6
| 518021 ||  || — || September 12, 2014 || Haleakala || Pan-STARRS ||  || align=right | 2.7 km || 
|-id=022 bgcolor=#d6d6d6
| 518022 ||  || — || September 17, 2014 || Haleakala || Pan-STARRS ||  || align=right | 3.2 km || 
|-id=023 bgcolor=#d6d6d6
| 518023 ||  || — || May 12, 1996 || Kitt Peak || Spacewatch ||  || align=right | 3.0 km || 
|-id=024 bgcolor=#d6d6d6
| 518024 ||  || — || January 23, 2006 || Mount Lemmon || Mount Lemmon Survey ||  || align=right | 2.8 km || 
|-id=025 bgcolor=#E9E9E9
| 518025 ||  || — || October 2, 2006 || Mount Lemmon || Mount Lemmon Survey ||  || align=right | 2.1 km || 
|-id=026 bgcolor=#d6d6d6
| 518026 ||  || — || April 26, 2007 || Mount Lemmon || Mount Lemmon Survey ||  || align=right | 2.8 km || 
|-id=027 bgcolor=#E9E9E9
| 518027 ||  || — || November 3, 2015 || Mount Lemmon || Mount Lemmon Survey ||  || align=right | 1.5 km || 
|-id=028 bgcolor=#fefefe
| 518028 ||  || — || January 4, 2013 || Kitt Peak || Spacewatch ||  || align=right data-sort-value="0.82" | 820 m || 
|-id=029 bgcolor=#d6d6d6
| 518029 ||  || — || September 1, 2014 || Mount Lemmon || Mount Lemmon Survey ||  || align=right | 2.4 km || 
|-id=030 bgcolor=#d6d6d6
| 518030 ||  || — || September 29, 2009 || Mount Lemmon || Mount Lemmon Survey ||  || align=right | 2.8 km || 
|-id=031 bgcolor=#fefefe
| 518031 ||  || — || July 2, 2014 || Haleakala || Pan-STARRS ||  || align=right data-sort-value="0.65" | 650 m || 
|-id=032 bgcolor=#d6d6d6
| 518032 ||  || — || October 10, 2010 || Mount Lemmon || Mount Lemmon Survey ||  || align=right | 2.9 km || 
|-id=033 bgcolor=#d6d6d6
| 518033 ||  || — || March 16, 2012 || Haleakala || Pan-STARRS ||  || align=right | 2.7 km || 
|-id=034 bgcolor=#E9E9E9
| 518034 ||  || — || June 14, 2010 || Mount Lemmon || Mount Lemmon Survey ||  || align=right | 2.0 km || 
|-id=035 bgcolor=#d6d6d6
| 518035 ||  || — || November 1, 2015 || Kitt Peak || Spacewatch ||  || align=right | 2.6 km || 
|-id=036 bgcolor=#d6d6d6
| 518036 ||  || — || June 28, 2014 || Haleakala || Pan-STARRS ||  || align=right | 2.6 km || 
|-id=037 bgcolor=#d6d6d6
| 518037 ||  || — || June 29, 2014 || Mount Lemmon || Mount Lemmon Survey ||  || align=right | 2.6 km || 
|-id=038 bgcolor=#d6d6d6
| 518038 ||  || — || April 14, 2013 || Mount Lemmon || Mount Lemmon Survey ||  || align=right | 3.0 km || 
|-id=039 bgcolor=#d6d6d6
| 518039 ||  || — || August 22, 2014 || Haleakala || Pan-STARRS ||  || align=right | 2.7 km || 
|-id=040 bgcolor=#d6d6d6
| 518040 ||  || — || April 16, 2012 || Haleakala || Pan-STARRS ||  || align=right | 3.2 km || 
|-id=041 bgcolor=#d6d6d6
| 518041 ||  || — || May 7, 2008 || Kitt Peak || Spacewatch ||  || align=right | 2.4 km || 
|-id=042 bgcolor=#E9E9E9
| 518042 ||  || — || November 12, 2006 || Mount Lemmon || Mount Lemmon Survey ||  || align=right | 1.7 km || 
|-id=043 bgcolor=#E9E9E9
| 518043 ||  || — || June 3, 2005 || Kitt Peak || Spacewatch ||  || align=right | 1.5 km || 
|-id=044 bgcolor=#E9E9E9
| 518044 ||  || — || September 19, 2006 || Kitt Peak || Spacewatch ||  || align=right | 1.6 km || 
|-id=045 bgcolor=#d6d6d6
| 518045 ||  || — || October 14, 2010 || Mount Lemmon || Mount Lemmon Survey ||  || align=right | 3.6 km || 
|-id=046 bgcolor=#d6d6d6
| 518046 ||  || — || September 18, 2003 || Kitt Peak || Spacewatch ||  || align=right | 2.3 km || 
|-id=047 bgcolor=#d6d6d6
| 518047 ||  || — || September 16, 2009 || Kitt Peak || Spacewatch ||  || align=right | 2.3 km || 
|-id=048 bgcolor=#d6d6d6
| 518048 ||  || — || April 28, 2012 || Mount Lemmon || Mount Lemmon Survey ||  || align=right | 2.8 km || 
|-id=049 bgcolor=#d6d6d6
| 518049 ||  || — || April 25, 2007 || Mount Lemmon || Mount Lemmon Survey || VER || align=right | 2.5 km || 
|-id=050 bgcolor=#E9E9E9
| 518050 ||  || — || June 4, 2014 || Haleakala || Pan-STARRS ||  || align=right | 1.9 km || 
|-id=051 bgcolor=#E9E9E9
| 518051 ||  || — || October 16, 2006 || Catalina || CSS ||  || align=right | 2.1 km || 
|-id=052 bgcolor=#d6d6d6
| 518052 ||  || — || November 17, 1998 || Kitt Peak || Spacewatch ||  || align=right | 2.7 km || 
|-id=053 bgcolor=#d6d6d6
| 518053 ||  || — || December 5, 2015 || Haleakala || Pan-STARRS ||  || align=right | 3.0 km || 
|-id=054 bgcolor=#d6d6d6
| 518054 ||  || — || September 27, 2009 || Mount Lemmon || Mount Lemmon Survey ||  || align=right | 3.4 km || 
|-id=055 bgcolor=#d6d6d6
| 518055 ||  || — || July 29, 2014 || Haleakala || Pan-STARRS || 7:4 || align=right | 2.9 km || 
|-id=056 bgcolor=#d6d6d6
| 518056 ||  || — || July 30, 2014 || Kitt Peak || Spacewatch ||  || align=right | 2.3 km || 
|-id=057 bgcolor=#d6d6d6
| 518057 ||  || — || May 15, 2008 || Mount Lemmon || Mount Lemmon Survey ||  || align=right | 3.8 km || 
|-id=058 bgcolor=#d6d6d6
| 518058 ||  || — || May 16, 2013 || Mount Lemmon || Mount Lemmon Survey || EOS || align=right | 2.0 km || 
|-id=059 bgcolor=#d6d6d6
| 518059 ||  || — || December 14, 2010 || Mount Lemmon || Mount Lemmon Survey ||  || align=right | 2.5 km || 
|-id=060 bgcolor=#d6d6d6
| 518060 ||  || — || October 24, 2009 || Mount Lemmon || Mount Lemmon Survey ||  || align=right | 3.0 km || 
|-id=061 bgcolor=#d6d6d6
| 518061 ||  || — || August 18, 2014 || Haleakala || Pan-STARRS ||  || align=right | 2.4 km || 
|-id=062 bgcolor=#d6d6d6
| 518062 ||  || — || November 8, 2010 || Mount Lemmon || Mount Lemmon Survey || EOS || align=right | 2.0 km || 
|-id=063 bgcolor=#d6d6d6
| 518063 ||  || — || February 27, 2012 || Haleakala || Pan-STARRS ||  || align=right | 3.0 km || 
|-id=064 bgcolor=#d6d6d6
| 518064 ||  || — || January 10, 2011 || Mount Lemmon || Mount Lemmon Survey ||  || align=right | 2.8 km || 
|-id=065 bgcolor=#d6d6d6
| 518065 ||  || — || May 11, 2007 || Mount Lemmon || Mount Lemmon Survey ||  || align=right | 2.7 km || 
|-id=066 bgcolor=#d6d6d6
| 518066 ||  || — || August 28, 2014 || Haleakala || Pan-STARRS ||  || align=right | 2.8 km || 
|-id=067 bgcolor=#d6d6d6
| 518067 ||  || — || April 15, 2013 || Haleakala || Pan-STARRS ||  || align=right | 3.2 km || 
|-id=068 bgcolor=#d6d6d6
| 518068 ||  || — || May 11, 2007 || Mount Lemmon || Mount Lemmon Survey ||  || align=right | 2.6 km || 
|-id=069 bgcolor=#fefefe
| 518069 ||  || — || November 7, 2008 || Mount Lemmon || Mount Lemmon Survey ||  || align=right data-sort-value="0.72" | 720 m || 
|-id=070 bgcolor=#d6d6d6
| 518070 ||  || — || October 9, 2008 || Mount Lemmon || Mount Lemmon Survey ||  || align=right | 2.2 km || 
|-id=071 bgcolor=#d6d6d6
| 518071 ||  || — || August 15, 2013 || Haleakala || Pan-STARRS ||  || align=right | 2.8 km || 
|-id=072 bgcolor=#E9E9E9
| 518072 ||  || — || February 27, 2012 || Haleakala || Pan-STARRS ||  || align=right data-sort-value="0.86" | 860 m || 
|-id=073 bgcolor=#d6d6d6
| 518073 ||  || — || September 23, 2008 || Mount Lemmon || Mount Lemmon Survey ||  || align=right | 3.1 km || 
|-id=074 bgcolor=#d6d6d6
| 518074 ||  || — || April 19, 2006 || Kitt Peak || Spacewatch ||  || align=right | 2.6 km || 
|-id=075 bgcolor=#d6d6d6
| 518075 ||  || — || July 25, 2015 || Haleakala || Pan-STARRS ||  || align=right | 3.1 km || 
|-id=076 bgcolor=#d6d6d6
| 518076 ||  || — || January 21, 2006 || Mount Lemmon || Mount Lemmon Survey ||  || align=right | 2.0 km || 
|-id=077 bgcolor=#d6d6d6
| 518077 ||  || — || October 8, 2008 || Mount Lemmon || Mount Lemmon Survey ||  || align=right | 2.7 km || 
|-id=078 bgcolor=#d6d6d6
| 518078 ||  || — || April 16, 2012 || Haleakala || Pan-STARRS ||  || align=right | 2.1 km || 
|-id=079 bgcolor=#d6d6d6
| 518079 ||  || — || September 24, 2008 || Mount Lemmon || Mount Lemmon Survey ||  || align=right | 3.4 km || 
|-id=080 bgcolor=#d6d6d6
| 518080 ||  || — || January 8, 2011 || Mount Lemmon || Mount Lemmon Survey ||  || align=right | 2.4 km || 
|-id=081 bgcolor=#d6d6d6
| 518081 ||  || — || October 7, 2008 || Mount Lemmon || Mount Lemmon Survey ||  || align=right | 2.1 km || 
|-id=082 bgcolor=#d6d6d6
| 518082 ||  || — || January 8, 2010 || Kitt Peak || Spacewatch || 7:4 || align=right | 2.9 km || 
|-id=083 bgcolor=#E9E9E9
| 518083 ||  || — || December 23, 1998 || Kitt Peak || Spacewatch ||  || align=right | 1.3 km || 
|-id=084 bgcolor=#d6d6d6
| 518084 ||  || — || February 4, 2005 || Mount Lemmon || Mount Lemmon Survey ||  || align=right | 2.8 km || 
|-id=085 bgcolor=#d6d6d6
| 518085 ||  || — || September 28, 2008 || Mount Lemmon || Mount Lemmon Survey ||  || align=right | 2.5 km || 
|-id=086 bgcolor=#d6d6d6
| 518086 ||  || — || August 12, 2013 || Haleakala || Pan-STARRS ||  || align=right | 3.2 km || 
|-id=087 bgcolor=#d6d6d6
| 518087 ||  || — || September 28, 2008 || Mount Lemmon || Mount Lemmon Survey ||  || align=right | 2.4 km || 
|-id=088 bgcolor=#d6d6d6
| 518088 ||  || — || July 1, 2013 || Haleakala || Pan-STARRS ||  || align=right | 2.9 km || 
|-id=089 bgcolor=#d6d6d6
| 518089 ||  || — || December 26, 2009 || Kitt Peak || Spacewatch ||  || align=right | 2.9 km || 
|-id=090 bgcolor=#d6d6d6
| 518090 ||  || — || November 1, 2014 || Kitt Peak || Spacewatch ||  || align=right | 1.9 km || 
|-id=091 bgcolor=#d6d6d6
| 518091 ||  || — || September 21, 2008 || Mount Lemmon || Mount Lemmon Survey ||  || align=right | 2.3 km || 
|-id=092 bgcolor=#d6d6d6
| 518092 ||  || — || March 15, 2011 || Haleakala || Pan-STARRS ||  || align=right | 3.1 km || 
|-id=093 bgcolor=#d6d6d6
| 518093 ||  || — || July 14, 2013 || Haleakala || Pan-STARRS ||  || align=right | 3.3 km || 
|-id=094 bgcolor=#d6d6d6
| 518094 ||  || — || November 19, 2003 || Anderson Mesa || LONEOS ||  || align=right | 3.0 km || 
|-id=095 bgcolor=#d6d6d6
| 518095 ||  || — || November 7, 2008 || Mount Lemmon || Mount Lemmon Survey ||  || align=right | 3.0 km || 
|-id=096 bgcolor=#d6d6d6
| 518096 ||  || — || September 14, 2013 || Kitt Peak || Spacewatch ||  || align=right | 2.9 km || 
|-id=097 bgcolor=#d6d6d6
| 518097 ||  || — || March 11, 2005 || Mount Lemmon || Mount Lemmon Survey ||  || align=right | 3.2 km || 
|-id=098 bgcolor=#d6d6d6
| 518098 ||  || — || April 28, 2011 || Kitt Peak || Spacewatch ||  || align=right | 3.5 km || 
|-id=099 bgcolor=#d6d6d6
| 518099 ||  || — || September 6, 2008 || Kitt Peak || Spacewatch ||  || align=right | 2.6 km || 
|-id=100 bgcolor=#d6d6d6
| 518100 ||  || — || January 4, 2011 || Mount Lemmon || Mount Lemmon Survey ||  || align=right | 2.5 km || 
|}

518101–518200 

|-bgcolor=#d6d6d6
| 518101 ||  || — || October 10, 2008 || Mount Lemmon || Mount Lemmon Survey ||  || align=right | 2.9 km || 
|-id=102 bgcolor=#d6d6d6
| 518102 ||  || — || August 15, 2013 || Haleakala || Pan-STARRS ||  || align=right | 2.4 km || 
|-id=103 bgcolor=#E9E9E9
| 518103 ||  || — || September 7, 2008 || Mount Lemmon || Mount Lemmon Survey ||  || align=right | 1.9 km || 
|-id=104 bgcolor=#d6d6d6
| 518104 ||  || — || August 14, 2013 || Haleakala || Pan-STARRS ||  || align=right | 2.8 km || 
|-id=105 bgcolor=#d6d6d6
| 518105 ||  || — || October 29, 2014 || Haleakala || Pan-STARRS ||  || align=right | 2.7 km || 
|-id=106 bgcolor=#d6d6d6
| 518106 ||  || — || December 19, 2009 || Mount Lemmon || Mount Lemmon Survey ||  || align=right | 3.3 km || 
|-id=107 bgcolor=#d6d6d6
| 518107 ||  || — || October 6, 2013 || Mount Lemmon || Mount Lemmon Survey ||  || align=right | 2.9 km || 
|-id=108 bgcolor=#d6d6d6
| 518108 ||  || — || December 24, 1998 || Kitt Peak || Spacewatch ||  || align=right | 2.7 km || 
|-id=109 bgcolor=#d6d6d6
| 518109 ||  || — || November 9, 2008 || Mount Lemmon || Mount Lemmon Survey ||  || align=right | 2.8 km || 
|-id=110 bgcolor=#E9E9E9
| 518110 ||  || — || September 24, 2009 || La Sagra || OAM Obs. ||  || align=right | 1.8 km || 
|-id=111 bgcolor=#d6d6d6
| 518111 ||  || — || January 19, 2005 || Kitt Peak || Spacewatch ||  || align=right | 3.3 km || 
|-id=112 bgcolor=#d6d6d6
| 518112 ||  || — || October 10, 2008 || Mount Lemmon || Mount Lemmon Survey ||  || align=right | 2.9 km || 
|-id=113 bgcolor=#d6d6d6
| 518113 ||  || — || September 29, 2008 || Mount Lemmon || Mount Lemmon Survey ||  || align=right | 2.4 km || 
|-id=114 bgcolor=#d6d6d6
| 518114 ||  || — || September 29, 2008 || Mount Lemmon || Mount Lemmon Survey ||  || align=right | 2.8 km || 
|-id=115 bgcolor=#d6d6d6
| 518115 ||  || — || October 7, 2008 || Mount Lemmon || Mount Lemmon Survey ||  || align=right | 2.5 km || 
|-id=116 bgcolor=#fefefe
| 518116 ||  || — || September 29, 2011 || Mount Lemmon || Mount Lemmon Survey ||  || align=right data-sort-value="0.55" | 550 m || 
|-id=117 bgcolor=#d6d6d6
| 518117 ||  || — || January 30, 2011 || Haleakala || Pan-STARRS ||  || align=right | 2.0 km || 
|-id=118 bgcolor=#E9E9E9
| 518118 ||  || — || March 27, 2012 || Catalina || CSS ||  || align=right | 1.2 km || 
|-id=119 bgcolor=#d6d6d6
| 518119 ||  || — || June 21, 2012 || Kitt Peak || Spacewatch ||  || align=right | 2.5 km || 
|-id=120 bgcolor=#E9E9E9
| 518120 ||  || — || February 1, 2006 || Mount Lemmon || Mount Lemmon Survey ||  || align=right | 2.8 km || 
|-id=121 bgcolor=#d6d6d6
| 518121 ||  || — || May 29, 2012 || Mount Lemmon || Mount Lemmon Survey ||  || align=right | 2.5 km || 
|-id=122 bgcolor=#d6d6d6
| 518122 ||  || — || November 24, 2014 || Haleakala || Pan-STARRS ||  || align=right | 2.1 km || 
|-id=123 bgcolor=#d6d6d6
| 518123 ||  || — || September 29, 2008 || Mount Lemmon || Mount Lemmon Survey ||  || align=right | 2.9 km || 
|-id=124 bgcolor=#d6d6d6
| 518124 ||  || — || November 20, 2008 || Mount Lemmon || Mount Lemmon Survey ||  || align=right | 2.7 km || 
|-id=125 bgcolor=#d6d6d6
| 518125 ||  || — || November 21, 2014 || Haleakala || Pan-STARRS ||  || align=right | 2.7 km || 
|-id=126 bgcolor=#d6d6d6
| 518126 ||  || — || August 12, 2013 || Haleakala || Pan-STARRS ||  || align=right | 2.2 km || 
|-id=127 bgcolor=#d6d6d6
| 518127 ||  || — || October 26, 2008 || Mount Lemmon || Mount Lemmon Survey ||  || align=right | 2.6 km || 
|-id=128 bgcolor=#d6d6d6
| 518128 ||  || — || September 14, 2013 || Haleakala || Pan-STARRS ||  || align=right | 2.6 km || 
|-id=129 bgcolor=#E9E9E9
| 518129 ||  || — || December 28, 2005 || Kitt Peak || Spacewatch ||  || align=right | 2.3 km || 
|-id=130 bgcolor=#d6d6d6
| 518130 ||  || — || November 29, 2003 || Kitt Peak || Spacewatch ||  || align=right | 2.7 km || 
|-id=131 bgcolor=#d6d6d6
| 518131 ||  || — || October 9, 2008 || Mount Lemmon || Mount Lemmon Survey ||  || align=right | 2.9 km || 
|-id=132 bgcolor=#d6d6d6
| 518132 ||  || — || November 24, 2008 || Mount Lemmon || Mount Lemmon Survey ||  || align=right | 3.1 km || 
|-id=133 bgcolor=#d6d6d6
| 518133 ||  || — || September 28, 2008 || Mount Lemmon || Mount Lemmon Survey ||  || align=right | 3.0 km || 
|-id=134 bgcolor=#E9E9E9
| 518134 ||  || — || July 28, 2008 || Mount Lemmon || Mount Lemmon Survey ||  || align=right | 1.5 km || 
|-id=135 bgcolor=#d6d6d6
| 518135 ||  || — || November 3, 2008 || Mount Lemmon || Mount Lemmon Survey ||  || align=right | 2.5 km || 
|-id=136 bgcolor=#E9E9E9
| 518136 ||  || — || January 6, 2012 || Haleakala || Pan-STARRS ||  || align=right | 1.9 km || 
|-id=137 bgcolor=#d6d6d6
| 518137 ||  || — || October 31, 2008 || Catalina || CSS ||  || align=right | 2.9 km || 
|-id=138 bgcolor=#E9E9E9
| 518138 ||  || — || January 28, 2011 || Mount Lemmon || Mount Lemmon Survey ||  || align=right | 2.0 km || 
|-id=139 bgcolor=#E9E9E9
| 518139 ||  || — || August 15, 2013 || Haleakala || Pan-STARRS ||  || align=right data-sort-value="0.74" | 740 m || 
|-id=140 bgcolor=#E9E9E9
| 518140 ||  || — || August 4, 2013 || Haleakala || Pan-STARRS ||  || align=right | 1.0 km || 
|-id=141 bgcolor=#d6d6d6
| 518141 ||  || — || June 7, 2011 || Haleakala || Pan-STARRS ||  || align=right | 2.0 km || 
|-id=142 bgcolor=#E9E9E9
| 518142 ||  || — || September 27, 2008 || Mount Lemmon || Mount Lemmon Survey ||  || align=right | 2.0 km || 
|-id=143 bgcolor=#E9E9E9
| 518143 ||  || — || May 13, 2007 || Mount Lemmon || Mount Lemmon Survey ||  || align=right | 1.8 km || 
|-id=144 bgcolor=#E9E9E9
| 518144 ||  || — || October 30, 2014 || Mount Lemmon || Mount Lemmon Survey ||  || align=right | 1.2 km || 
|-id=145 bgcolor=#E9E9E9
| 518145 ||  || — || December 29, 2014 || Haleakala || Pan-STARRS ||  || align=right | 2.0 km || 
|-id=146 bgcolor=#d6d6d6
| 518146 ||  || — || February 19, 2010 || Mount Lemmon || Mount Lemmon Survey ||  || align=right | 3.9 km || 
|-id=147 bgcolor=#E9E9E9
| 518147 ||  || — || July 29, 2008 || Kitt Peak || Spacewatch ||  || align=right | 1.6 km || 
|-id=148 bgcolor=#d6d6d6
| 518148 ||  || — || March 2, 2011 || Kitt Peak || Spacewatch ||  || align=right | 1.9 km || 
|-id=149 bgcolor=#d6d6d6
| 518149 ||  || — || November 20, 2008 || Mount Lemmon || Mount Lemmon Survey ||  || align=right | 2.6 km || 
|-id=150 bgcolor=#d6d6d6
| 518150 ||  || — || April 1, 2011 || Kitt Peak || Spacewatch ||  || align=right | 2.1 km || 
|-id=151 bgcolor=#C7FF8F
| 518151 ||  || — || March 29, 2016 || Haleakala || Pan-STARRS || centaurdamocloidcritical || align=right | 39 km || 
|-id=152 bgcolor=#d6d6d6
| 518152 ||  || — || September 20, 2003 || Kitt Peak || Spacewatch ||  || align=right | 2.5 km || 
|-id=153 bgcolor=#d6d6d6
| 518153 ||  || — || September 14, 2013 || Haleakala || Pan-STARRS ||  || align=right | 2.0 km || 
|-id=154 bgcolor=#E9E9E9
| 518154 ||  || — || October 27, 2008 || Mount Lemmon || Mount Lemmon Survey ||  || align=right | 2.6 km || 
|-id=155 bgcolor=#d6d6d6
| 518155 ||  || — || January 30, 2006 || Kitt Peak || Spacewatch ||  || align=right | 2.3 km || 
|-id=156 bgcolor=#fefefe
| 518156 ||  || — || February 19, 2009 || Kitt Peak || Spacewatch ||  || align=right data-sort-value="0.61" | 610 m || 
|-id=157 bgcolor=#E9E9E9
| 518157 ||  || — || March 18, 2007 || Catalina || CSS ||  || align=right | 1.3 km || 
|-id=158 bgcolor=#d6d6d6
| 518158 ||  || — || January 17, 2015 || Haleakala || Pan-STARRS ||  || align=right | 2.8 km || 
|-id=159 bgcolor=#d6d6d6
| 518159 ||  || — || November 19, 2008 || Mount Lemmon || Mount Lemmon Survey ||  || align=right | 2.6 km || 
|-id=160 bgcolor=#E9E9E9
| 518160 ||  || — || October 27, 2008 || Mount Lemmon || Mount Lemmon Survey ||  || align=right | 2.3 km || 
|-id=161 bgcolor=#E9E9E9
| 518161 ||  || — || September 27, 2008 || Mount Lemmon || Mount Lemmon Survey ||  || align=right | 2.3 km || 
|-id=162 bgcolor=#E9E9E9
| 518162 ||  || — || September 27, 2008 || Mount Lemmon || Mount Lemmon Survey ||  || align=right | 2.3 km || 
|-id=163 bgcolor=#d6d6d6
| 518163 ||  || — || October 9, 2008 || Mount Lemmon || Mount Lemmon Survey ||  || align=right | 2.0 km || 
|-id=164 bgcolor=#E9E9E9
| 518164 ||  || — || October 9, 2008 || Mount Lemmon || Mount Lemmon Survey ||  || align=right | 1.5 km || 
|-id=165 bgcolor=#E9E9E9
| 518165 ||  || — || December 8, 2010 || Mount Lemmon || Mount Lemmon Survey ||  || align=right | 1.7 km || 
|-id=166 bgcolor=#d6d6d6
| 518166 ||  || — || December 4, 2013 || Haleakala || Pan-STARRS ||  || align=right | 2.9 km || 
|-id=167 bgcolor=#d6d6d6
| 518167 ||  || — || October 7, 2008 || Mount Lemmon || Mount Lemmon Survey ||  || align=right | 2.5 km || 
|-id=168 bgcolor=#d6d6d6
| 518168 ||  || — || December 19, 2003 || Kitt Peak || Spacewatch ||  || align=right | 3.0 km || 
|-id=169 bgcolor=#E9E9E9
| 518169 ||  || — || September 29, 2008 || Kitt Peak || Spacewatch ||  || align=right | 1.9 km || 
|-id=170 bgcolor=#E9E9E9
| 518170 ||  || — || November 9, 2008 || Mount Lemmon || Mount Lemmon Survey ||  || align=right | 2.8 km || 
|-id=171 bgcolor=#fefefe
| 518171 ||  || — || January 14, 2015 || Haleakala || Pan-STARRS || H || align=right data-sort-value="0.62" | 620 m || 
|-id=172 bgcolor=#fefefe
| 518172 ||  || — || September 23, 2011 || Haleakala || Pan-STARRS || H || align=right data-sort-value="0.57" | 570 m || 
|-id=173 bgcolor=#E9E9E9
| 518173 ||  || — || January 16, 2007 || Anderson Mesa || LONEOS ||  || align=right | 1.3 km || 
|-id=174 bgcolor=#E9E9E9
| 518174 ||  || — || September 4, 2008 || Kitt Peak || Spacewatch ||  || align=right | 1.9 km || 
|-id=175 bgcolor=#E9E9E9
| 518175 ||  || — || September 23, 2008 || Mount Lemmon || Mount Lemmon Survey ||  || align=right | 1.5 km || 
|-id=176 bgcolor=#E9E9E9
| 518176 ||  || — || October 10, 2008 || Mount Lemmon || Mount Lemmon Survey ||  || align=right | 1.4 km || 
|-id=177 bgcolor=#E9E9E9
| 518177 ||  || — || October 17, 2012 || Mount Lemmon || Mount Lemmon Survey ||  || align=right | 2.5 km || 
|-id=178 bgcolor=#fefefe
| 518178 ||  || — || February 17, 2010 || Catalina || CSS || H || align=right data-sort-value="0.71" | 710 m || 
|-id=179 bgcolor=#E9E9E9
| 518179 ||  || — || April 27, 2011 || Kitt Peak || Spacewatch ||  || align=right | 1.3 km || 
|-id=180 bgcolor=#E9E9E9
| 518180 ||  || — || February 18, 2015 || Haleakala || Pan-STARRS ||  || align=right | 1.1 km || 
|-id=181 bgcolor=#E9E9E9
| 518181 ||  || — || November 24, 2008 || Mount Lemmon || Mount Lemmon Survey ||  || align=right | 1.4 km || 
|-id=182 bgcolor=#E9E9E9
| 518182 ||  || — || October 10, 2012 || Haleakala || Pan-STARRS ||  || align=right | 2.5 km || 
|-id=183 bgcolor=#E9E9E9
| 518183 ||  || — || September 9, 2008 || Mount Lemmon || Mount Lemmon Survey ||  || align=right | 1.1 km || 
|-id=184 bgcolor=#E9E9E9
| 518184 ||  || — || May 10, 2007 || Mount Lemmon || Mount Lemmon Survey ||  || align=right | 1.2 km || 
|-id=185 bgcolor=#E9E9E9
| 518185 ||  || — || October 30, 2008 || Mount Lemmon || Mount Lemmon Survey ||  || align=right | 1.3 km || 
|-id=186 bgcolor=#E9E9E9
| 518186 ||  || — || May 18, 2015 || Haleakala || Pan-STARRS ||  || align=right | 1.8 km || 
|-id=187 bgcolor=#E9E9E9
| 518187 ||  || — || March 31, 2011 || Haleakala || Pan-STARRS ||  || align=right | 1.1 km || 
|-id=188 bgcolor=#E9E9E9
| 518188 ||  || — || November 1, 2008 || Mount Lemmon || Mount Lemmon Survey ||  || align=right | 1.1 km || 
|-id=189 bgcolor=#E9E9E9
| 518189 ||  || — || October 21, 2007 || Kitt Peak || Spacewatch ||  || align=right | 2.2 km || 
|-id=190 bgcolor=#E9E9E9
| 518190 ||  || — || January 13, 2010 || Mount Lemmon || Mount Lemmon Survey ||  || align=right | 1.7 km || 
|-id=191 bgcolor=#d6d6d6
| 518191 ||  || — || October 17, 2006 || Catalina || CSS ||  || align=right | 3.2 km || 
|-id=192 bgcolor=#E9E9E9
| 518192 ||  || — || December 7, 2008 || Mount Lemmon || Mount Lemmon Survey ||  || align=right | 1.4 km || 
|-id=193 bgcolor=#fefefe
| 518193 ||  || — || January 19, 2015 || Mount Lemmon || Mount Lemmon Survey || H || align=right data-sort-value="0.66" | 660 m || 
|-id=194 bgcolor=#E9E9E9
| 518194 ||  || — || December 31, 2013 || Kitt Peak || Spacewatch ||  || align=right | 1.2 km || 
|-id=195 bgcolor=#E9E9E9
| 518195 ||  || — || October 2, 2008 || Mount Lemmon || Mount Lemmon Survey ||  || align=right data-sort-value="0.76" | 760 m || 
|-id=196 bgcolor=#E9E9E9
| 518196 ||  || — || October 3, 2008 || Mount Lemmon || Mount Lemmon Survey ||  || align=right | 1.7 km || 
|-id=197 bgcolor=#d6d6d6
| 518197 ||  || — || February 16, 2004 || Kitt Peak || Spacewatch ||  || align=right | 2.0 km || 
|-id=198 bgcolor=#E9E9E9
| 518198 ||  || — || September 9, 2008 || Mount Lemmon || Mount Lemmon Survey ||  || align=right | 1.1 km || 
|-id=199 bgcolor=#fefefe
| 518199 ||  || — || February 9, 2014 || Mount Lemmon || Mount Lemmon Survey ||  || align=right data-sort-value="0.95" | 950 m || 
|-id=200 bgcolor=#E9E9E9
| 518200 ||  || — || June 10, 2011 || Mount Lemmon || Mount Lemmon Survey ||  || align=right | 1.0 km || 
|}

518201–518300 

|-bgcolor=#E9E9E9
| 518201 ||  || — || September 30, 2008 || Catalina || CSS ||  || align=right | 1.8 km || 
|-id=202 bgcolor=#E9E9E9
| 518202 ||  || — || May 26, 2011 || Mount Lemmon || Mount Lemmon Survey ||  || align=right | 1.3 km || 
|-id=203 bgcolor=#E9E9E9
| 518203 ||  || — || October 7, 2012 || Haleakala || Pan-STARRS ||  || align=right | 1.2 km || 
|-id=204 bgcolor=#E9E9E9
| 518204 ||  || — || October 19, 2012 || Haleakala || Pan-STARRS ||  || align=right | 1.4 km || 
|-id=205 bgcolor=#E9E9E9
| 518205 ||  || — || October 8, 2012 || Kitt Peak || Spacewatch ||  || align=right data-sort-value="0.98" | 980 m || 
|-id=206 bgcolor=#E9E9E9
| 518206 ||  || — || September 22, 2008 || Mount Lemmon || Mount Lemmon Survey ||  || align=right | 1.5 km || 
|-id=207 bgcolor=#fefefe
| 518207 ||  || — || May 21, 2015 || Haleakala || Pan-STARRS ||  || align=right data-sort-value="0.73" | 730 m || 
|-id=208 bgcolor=#E9E9E9
| 518208 ||  || — || September 30, 2007 || Kitt Peak || Spacewatch ||  || align=right | 2.1 km || 
|-id=209 bgcolor=#d6d6d6
| 518209 ||  || — || November 16, 2006 || Kitt Peak || Spacewatch ||  || align=right | 3.5 km || 
|-id=210 bgcolor=#fefefe
| 518210 ||  || — || September 3, 2005 || Catalina || CSS || H || align=right data-sort-value="0.78" | 780 m || 
|-id=211 bgcolor=#E9E9E9
| 518211 ||  || — || October 26, 2012 || Haleakala || Pan-STARRS ||  || align=right data-sort-value="0.94" | 940 m || 
|-id=212 bgcolor=#E9E9E9
| 518212 ||  || — || September 25, 2008 || Mount Lemmon || Mount Lemmon Survey ||  || align=right | 1.1 km || 
|-id=213 bgcolor=#E9E9E9
| 518213 ||  || — || October 24, 2008 || Mount Lemmon || Mount Lemmon Survey ||  || align=right | 2.2 km || 
|-id=214 bgcolor=#E9E9E9
| 518214 ||  || — || November 1, 2008 || Mount Lemmon || Mount Lemmon Survey ||  || align=right data-sort-value="0.86" | 860 m || 
|-id=215 bgcolor=#E9E9E9
| 518215 ||  || — || February 10, 2014 || Catalina || CSS ||  || align=right | 1.8 km || 
|-id=216 bgcolor=#E9E9E9
| 518216 ||  || — || November 6, 2008 || Mount Lemmon || Mount Lemmon Survey ||  || align=right | 1.1 km || 
|-id=217 bgcolor=#E9E9E9
| 518217 ||  || — || November 9, 2008 || Mount Lemmon || Mount Lemmon Survey ||  || align=right data-sort-value="0.87" | 870 m || 
|-id=218 bgcolor=#fefefe
| 518218 ||  || — || April 6, 2005 || Kitt Peak || Spacewatch || H || align=right data-sort-value="0.59" | 590 m || 
|-id=219 bgcolor=#fefefe
| 518219 ||  || — || November 23, 2014 || Haleakala || Pan-STARRS || H || align=right data-sort-value="0.48" | 480 m || 
|-id=220 bgcolor=#fefefe
| 518220 ||  || — || January 15, 2015 || Haleakala || Pan-STARRS || H || align=right data-sort-value="0.71" | 710 m || 
|-id=221 bgcolor=#fefefe
| 518221 ||  || — || August 28, 2016 || Mount Lemmon || Mount Lemmon Survey || H || align=right data-sort-value="0.60" | 600 m || 
|-id=222 bgcolor=#fefefe
| 518222 ||  || — || March 19, 2015 || Haleakala || Pan-STARRS || H || align=right data-sort-value="0.53" | 530 m || 
|-id=223 bgcolor=#fefefe
| 518223 ||  || — || May 2, 2013 || Haleakala || Pan-STARRS || H || align=right data-sort-value="0.69" | 690 m || 
|-id=224 bgcolor=#fefefe
| 518224 ||  || — || March 8, 2005 || Mount Lemmon || Mount Lemmon Survey || H || align=right data-sort-value="0.59" | 590 m || 
|-id=225 bgcolor=#fefefe
| 518225 ||  || — || November 18, 2011 || Kitt Peak || Spacewatch || H || align=right data-sort-value="0.82" | 820 m || 
|-id=226 bgcolor=#E9E9E9
| 518226 ||  || — || October 6, 2008 || Mount Lemmon || Mount Lemmon Survey ||  || align=right data-sort-value="0.90" | 900 m || 
|-id=227 bgcolor=#fefefe
| 518227 ||  || — || April 7, 2005 || Kitt Peak || Spacewatch || H || align=right data-sort-value="0.78" | 780 m || 
|-id=228 bgcolor=#fefefe
| 518228 ||  || — || April 15, 2008 || Kitt Peak || Spacewatch ||  || align=right data-sort-value="0.73" | 730 m || 
|-id=229 bgcolor=#fefefe
| 518229 ||  || — || February 20, 2015 || Haleakala || Pan-STARRS || H || align=right data-sort-value="0.55" | 550 m || 
|-id=230 bgcolor=#fefefe
| 518230 ||  || — || November 28, 2013 || Mount Lemmon || Mount Lemmon Survey ||  || align=right data-sort-value="0.62" | 620 m || 
|-id=231 bgcolor=#E9E9E9
| 518231 ||  || — || January 1, 2009 || Kitt Peak || Spacewatch ||  || align=right | 1.5 km || 
|-id=232 bgcolor=#fefefe
| 518232 ||  || — || September 23, 2005 || Kitt Peak || Spacewatch ||  || align=right data-sort-value="0.76" | 760 m || 
|-id=233 bgcolor=#fefefe
| 518233 ||  || — || September 14, 2009 || Catalina || CSS ||  || align=right data-sort-value="0.94" | 940 m || 
|-id=234 bgcolor=#fefefe
| 518234 ||  || — || September 19, 2006 || Kitt Peak || Spacewatch ||  || align=right data-sort-value="0.49" | 490 m || 
|-id=235 bgcolor=#fefefe
| 518235 ||  || — || October 24, 2005 || Kitt Peak || Spacewatch ||  || align=right data-sort-value="0.62" | 620 m || 
|-id=236 bgcolor=#fefefe
| 518236 ||  || — || September 29, 2005 || Mount Lemmon || Mount Lemmon Survey ||  || align=right data-sort-value="0.62" | 620 m || 
|-id=237 bgcolor=#fefefe
| 518237 ||  || — || October 25, 2013 || Mount Lemmon || Mount Lemmon Survey ||  || align=right data-sort-value="0.72" | 720 m || 
|-id=238 bgcolor=#E9E9E9
| 518238 ||  || — || October 17, 2012 || Mount Lemmon || Mount Lemmon Survey ||  || align=right | 1.1 km || 
|-id=239 bgcolor=#fefefe
| 518239 ||  || — || August 29, 2005 || Kitt Peak || Spacewatch ||  || align=right data-sort-value="0.85" | 850 m || 
|-id=240 bgcolor=#fefefe
| 518240 ||  || — || July 8, 2008 || Mount Lemmon || Mount Lemmon Survey || H || align=right data-sort-value="0.75" | 750 m || 
|-id=241 bgcolor=#d6d6d6
| 518241 ||  || — || December 31, 2007 || Kitt Peak || Spacewatch ||  || align=right | 3.0 km || 
|-id=242 bgcolor=#fefefe
| 518242 ||  || — || January 10, 2007 || Mount Lemmon || Mount Lemmon Survey ||  || align=right data-sort-value="0.75" | 750 m || 
|-id=243 bgcolor=#d6d6d6
| 518243 ||  || — || January 27, 2007 || Kitt Peak || Spacewatch ||  || align=right | 2.9 km || 
|-id=244 bgcolor=#d6d6d6
| 518244 ||  || — || September 2, 2010 || Mount Lemmon || Mount Lemmon Survey ||  || align=right | 3.5 km || 
|-id=245 bgcolor=#E9E9E9
| 518245 ||  || — || October 20, 2012 || Mount Lemmon || Mount Lemmon Survey ||  || align=right | 1.6 km || 
|-id=246 bgcolor=#fefefe
| 518246 ||  || — || September 21, 2009 || Mount Lemmon || Mount Lemmon Survey ||  || align=right data-sort-value="0.62" | 620 m || 
|-id=247 bgcolor=#fefefe
| 518247 ||  || — || October 8, 2012 || Mount Lemmon || Mount Lemmon Survey ||  || align=right data-sort-value="0.64" | 640 m || 
|-id=248 bgcolor=#fefefe
| 518248 ||  || — || May 9, 2007 || Mount Lemmon || Mount Lemmon Survey ||  || align=right data-sort-value="0.83" | 830 m || 
|-id=249 bgcolor=#fefefe
| 518249 ||  || — || November 15, 2006 || Kitt Peak || Spacewatch ||  || align=right data-sort-value="0.62" | 620 m || 
|-id=250 bgcolor=#fefefe
| 518250 ||  || — || September 26, 2012 || Mount Lemmon || Mount Lemmon Survey ||  || align=right data-sort-value="0.89" | 890 m || 
|-id=251 bgcolor=#fefefe
| 518251 ||  || — || August 24, 2012 || Kitt Peak || Spacewatch ||  || align=right data-sort-value="0.89" | 890 m || 
|-id=252 bgcolor=#E9E9E9
| 518252 ||  || — || November 6, 2008 || Mount Lemmon || Mount Lemmon Survey ||  || align=right | 1.0 km || 
|-id=253 bgcolor=#fefefe
| 518253 ||  || — || September 6, 2010 || Kitt Peak || Spacewatch ||  || align=right data-sort-value="0.69" | 690 m || 
|-id=254 bgcolor=#fefefe
| 518254 ||  || — || December 16, 2009 || Mount Lemmon || Mount Lemmon Survey ||  || align=right | 1.0 km || 
|-id=255 bgcolor=#E9E9E9
| 518255 ||  || — || October 15, 2007 || Mount Lemmon || Mount Lemmon Survey ||  || align=right | 1.3 km || 
|-id=256 bgcolor=#fefefe
| 518256 ||  || — || November 9, 2008 || Mount Lemmon || Mount Lemmon Survey || H || align=right data-sort-value="0.75" | 750 m || 
|-id=257 bgcolor=#d6d6d6
| 518257 ||  || — || October 3, 2015 || Mount Lemmon || Mount Lemmon Survey ||  || align=right | 3.1 km || 
|-id=258 bgcolor=#d6d6d6
| 518258 ||  || — || November 25, 2011 || Haleakala || Pan-STARRS ||  || align=right | 2.1 km || 
|-id=259 bgcolor=#E9E9E9
| 518259 ||  || — || January 28, 2009 || Catalina || CSS ||  || align=right | 1.4 km || 
|-id=260 bgcolor=#fefefe
| 518260 ||  || — || September 29, 2009 || Mount Lemmon || Mount Lemmon Survey ||  || align=right data-sort-value="0.67" | 670 m || 
|-id=261 bgcolor=#E9E9E9
| 518261 ||  || — || October 9, 2016 || Kitt Peak || Spacewatch ||  || align=right data-sort-value="0.93" | 930 m || 
|-id=262 bgcolor=#E9E9E9
| 518262 ||  || — || November 14, 2007 || Mount Lemmon || Mount Lemmon Survey ||  || align=right | 1.8 km || 
|-id=263 bgcolor=#fefefe
| 518263 ||  || — || November 25, 2005 || Kitt Peak || Spacewatch ||  || align=right data-sort-value="0.93" | 930 m || 
|-id=264 bgcolor=#E9E9E9
| 518264 ||  || — || November 1, 2007 || Kitt Peak || Spacewatch ||  || align=right | 2.0 km || 
|-id=265 bgcolor=#fefefe
| 518265 ||  || — || March 15, 2011 || Haleakala || Pan-STARRS ||  || align=right data-sort-value="0.85" | 850 m || 
|-id=266 bgcolor=#E9E9E9
| 518266 ||  || — || December 22, 2012 || Haleakala || Pan-STARRS ||  || align=right | 1.5 km || 
|-id=267 bgcolor=#d6d6d6
| 518267 ||  || — || August 3, 2015 || Haleakala || Pan-STARRS ||  || align=right | 2.9 km || 
|-id=268 bgcolor=#E9E9E9
| 518268 ||  || — || December 12, 2012 || Haleakala || Pan-STARRS ||  || align=right data-sort-value="0.86" | 860 m || 
|-id=269 bgcolor=#E9E9E9
| 518269 ||  || — || January 2, 2009 || Mount Lemmon || Mount Lemmon Survey ||  || align=right | 1.2 km || 
|-id=270 bgcolor=#E9E9E9
| 518270 ||  || — || January 20, 2009 || Mount Lemmon || Mount Lemmon Survey ||  || align=right | 1.5 km || 
|-id=271 bgcolor=#E9E9E9
| 518271 ||  || — || March 29, 2009 || Catalina || CSS ||  || align=right | 2.0 km || 
|-id=272 bgcolor=#d6d6d6
| 518272 ||  || — || March 1, 2008 || Kitt Peak || Spacewatch ||  || align=right | 2.4 km || 
|-id=273 bgcolor=#E9E9E9
| 518273 ||  || — || September 4, 2011 || Haleakala || Pan-STARRS ||  || align=right | 2.1 km || 
|-id=274 bgcolor=#E9E9E9
| 518274 ||  || — || October 7, 1999 || Socorro || LINEAR ||  || align=right | 1.8 km || 
|-id=275 bgcolor=#d6d6d6
| 518275 ||  || — || October 22, 2005 || Kitt Peak || Spacewatch ||  || align=right | 2.5 km || 
|-id=276 bgcolor=#d6d6d6
| 518276 ||  || — || January 27, 2007 || Kitt Peak || Spacewatch ||  || align=right | 3.4 km || 
|-id=277 bgcolor=#fefefe
| 518277 ||  || — || January 31, 2003 || Anderson Mesa || LONEOS ||  || align=right | 1.2 km || 
|-id=278 bgcolor=#E9E9E9
| 518278 ||  || — || February 4, 2005 || Catalina || CSS ||  || align=right | 1.2 km || 
|-id=279 bgcolor=#E9E9E9
| 518279 ||  || — || December 8, 2012 || Mount Lemmon || Mount Lemmon Survey ||  || align=right | 1.2 km || 
|-id=280 bgcolor=#fefefe
| 518280 ||  || — || December 14, 2004 || Kitt Peak || Spacewatch ||  || align=right | 1.0 km || 
|-id=281 bgcolor=#E9E9E9
| 518281 ||  || — || January 20, 2009 || Catalina || CSS ||  || align=right | 1.4 km || 
|-id=282 bgcolor=#d6d6d6
| 518282 ||  || — || September 23, 2015 || Haleakala || Pan-STARRS ||  || align=right | 2.3 km || 
|-id=283 bgcolor=#d6d6d6
| 518283 ||  || — || May 16, 2007 || Mount Lemmon || Mount Lemmon Survey ||  || align=right | 3.2 km || 
|-id=284 bgcolor=#d6d6d6
| 518284 ||  || — || January 22, 2012 || Haleakala || Pan-STARRS ||  || align=right | 2.9 km || 
|-id=285 bgcolor=#d6d6d6
| 518285 ||  || — || March 13, 2012 || Mount Lemmon || Mount Lemmon Survey ||  || align=right | 3.0 km || 
|-id=286 bgcolor=#E9E9E9
| 518286 ||  || — || August 21, 2006 || Kitt Peak || Spacewatch ||  || align=right | 2.2 km || 
|-id=287 bgcolor=#d6d6d6
| 518287 ||  || — || December 2, 2010 || Mount Lemmon || Mount Lemmon Survey ||  || align=right | 2.4 km || 
|-id=288 bgcolor=#d6d6d6
| 518288 ||  || — || January 21, 2012 || Catalina || CSS ||  || align=right | 2.9 km || 
|-id=289 bgcolor=#d6d6d6
| 518289 ||  || — || January 26, 2012 || Kitt Peak || Spacewatch ||  || align=right | 3.2 km || 
|-id=290 bgcolor=#fefefe
| 518290 ||  || — || October 8, 2008 || Mount Lemmon || Mount Lemmon Survey ||  || align=right | 1.3 km || 
|-id=291 bgcolor=#d6d6d6
| 518291 ||  || — || March 13, 2007 || Mount Lemmon || Mount Lemmon Survey ||  || align=right | 3.2 km || 
|-id=292 bgcolor=#d6d6d6
| 518292 ||  || — || November 25, 2006 || Catalina || CSS ||  || align=right | 2.8 km || 
|-id=293 bgcolor=#E9E9E9
| 518293 ||  || — || October 20, 2006 || Catalina || CSS ||  || align=right | 2.9 km || 
|-id=294 bgcolor=#E9E9E9
| 518294 ||  || — || February 26, 2008 || Kitt Peak || Spacewatch ||  || align=right | 2.0 km || 
|-id=295 bgcolor=#d6d6d6
| 518295 ||  || — || February 22, 2006 || Anderson Mesa || LONEOS ||  || align=right | 4.3 km || 
|-id=296 bgcolor=#fefefe
| 518296 ||  || — || November 11, 2004 || Kitt Peak || Spacewatch ||  || align=right data-sort-value="0.96" | 960 m || 
|-id=297 bgcolor=#d6d6d6
| 518297 ||  || — || October 15, 2004 || Mount Lemmon || Mount Lemmon Survey ||  || align=right | 2.3 km || 
|-id=298 bgcolor=#d6d6d6
| 518298 ||  || — || January 31, 2006 || Mount Lemmon || Mount Lemmon Survey ||  || align=right | 2.8 km || 
|-id=299 bgcolor=#d6d6d6
| 518299 ||  || — || August 15, 2009 || Kitt Peak || Spacewatch ||  || align=right | 3.2 km || 
|-id=300 bgcolor=#d6d6d6
| 518300 ||  || — || January 2, 2011 || Mount Lemmon || Mount Lemmon Survey ||  || align=right | 3.2 km || 
|}

518301–518400 

|-bgcolor=#d6d6d6
| 518301 ||  || — || March 12, 2007 || Mount Lemmon || Mount Lemmon Survey ||  || align=right | 2.2 km || 
|-id=302 bgcolor=#E9E9E9
| 518302 ||  || — || January 13, 2008 || Mount Lemmon || Mount Lemmon Survey ||  || align=right | 2.0 km || 
|-id=303 bgcolor=#d6d6d6
| 518303 ||  || — || December 10, 2010 || Mount Lemmon || Mount Lemmon Survey ||  || align=right | 3.3 km || 
|-id=304 bgcolor=#d6d6d6
| 518304 ||  || — || April 15, 2007 || Mount Lemmon || Mount Lemmon Survey ||  || align=right | 2.8 km || 
|-id=305 bgcolor=#d6d6d6
| 518305 ||  || — || February 22, 2007 || Kitt Peak || Spacewatch ||  || align=right | 2.2 km || 
|-id=306 bgcolor=#d6d6d6
| 518306 ||  || — || January 8, 2006 || Mount Lemmon || Mount Lemmon Survey || Tj (2.96) || align=right | 4.0 km || 
|-id=307 bgcolor=#d6d6d6
| 518307 ||  || — || December 28, 2005 || Kitt Peak || Spacewatch ||  || align=right | 3.2 km || 
|-id=308 bgcolor=#d6d6d6
| 518308 ||  || — || November 22, 2005 || Kitt Peak || Spacewatch ||  || align=right | 3.3 km || 
|-id=309 bgcolor=#E9E9E9
| 518309 ||  || — || February 7, 2008 || Kitt Peak || Spacewatch ||  || align=right | 2.2 km || 
|-id=310 bgcolor=#d6d6d6
| 518310 ||  || — || February 20, 2006 || Kitt Peak || Spacewatch ||  || align=right | 2.7 km || 
|-id=311 bgcolor=#E9E9E9
| 518311 ||  || — || April 29, 2009 || Kitt Peak || Spacewatch ||  || align=right | 2.5 km || 
|-id=312 bgcolor=#d6d6d6
| 518312 ||  || — || December 3, 2005 || Kitt Peak || Spacewatch ||  || align=right | 2.9 km || 
|-id=313 bgcolor=#d6d6d6
| 518313 ||  || — || September 21, 2009 || Mount Lemmon || Mount Lemmon Survey ||  || align=right | 2.5 km || 
|-id=314 bgcolor=#d6d6d6
| 518314 ||  || — || November 10, 2004 || Kitt Peak || Spacewatch ||  || align=right | 3.3 km || 
|-id=315 bgcolor=#d6d6d6
| 518315 ||  || — || October 12, 2005 || Kitt Peak || Spacewatch ||  || align=right | 3.1 km || 
|-id=316 bgcolor=#d6d6d6
| 518316 ||  || — || November 25, 2006 || Kitt Peak || Spacewatch ||  || align=right | 1.8 km || 
|-id=317 bgcolor=#d6d6d6
| 518317 ||  || — || February 22, 2006 || Kitt Peak || Spacewatch ||  || align=right | 2.4 km || 
|-id=318 bgcolor=#d6d6d6
| 518318 ||  || — || October 22, 2005 || Kitt Peak || Spacewatch ||  || align=right | 2.0 km || 
|-id=319 bgcolor=#d6d6d6
| 518319 ||  || — || August 27, 2014 || Haleakala || Pan-STARRS ||  || align=right | 2.5 km || 
|-id=320 bgcolor=#d6d6d6
| 518320 ||  || — || October 9, 2004 || Kitt Peak || Spacewatch ||  || align=right | 2.9 km || 
|-id=321 bgcolor=#d6d6d6
| 518321 ||  || — || November 3, 2010 || Mount Lemmon || Mount Lemmon Survey ||  || align=right | 3.0 km || 
|-id=322 bgcolor=#E9E9E9
| 518322 ||  || — || August 3, 2015 || Haleakala || Pan-STARRS ||  || align=right data-sort-value="0.89" | 890 m || 
|-id=323 bgcolor=#d6d6d6
| 518323 ||  || — || March 23, 2006 || Catalina || CSS ||  || align=right | 3.3 km || 
|-id=324 bgcolor=#E9E9E9
| 518324 ||  || — || October 3, 2006 || Mount Lemmon || Mount Lemmon Survey ||  || align=right | 2.0 km || 
|-id=325 bgcolor=#d6d6d6
| 518325 ||  || — || August 20, 2014 || Haleakala || Pan-STARRS ||  || align=right | 2.3 km || 
|-id=326 bgcolor=#E9E9E9
| 518326 ||  || — || September 5, 2010 || Mount Lemmon || Mount Lemmon Survey ||  || align=right | 2.2 km || 
|-id=327 bgcolor=#d6d6d6
| 518327 ||  || — || September 2, 2014 || Haleakala || Pan-STARRS ||  || align=right | 3.3 km || 
|-id=328 bgcolor=#E9E9E9
| 518328 ||  || — || May 30, 2009 || Mount Lemmon || Mount Lemmon Survey ||  || align=right | 2.2 km || 
|-id=329 bgcolor=#d6d6d6
| 518329 ||  || — || October 8, 2015 || Haleakala || Pan-STARRS ||  || align=right | 2.9 km || 
|-id=330 bgcolor=#d6d6d6
| 518330 ||  || — || September 23, 2009 || Mount Lemmon || Mount Lemmon Survey ||  || align=right | 3.1 km || 
|-id=331 bgcolor=#E9E9E9
| 518331 ||  || — || October 20, 2007 || Mount Lemmon || Mount Lemmon Survey ||  || align=right | 1.3 km || 
|-id=332 bgcolor=#d6d6d6
| 518332 ||  || — || September 9, 2015 || Haleakala || Pan-STARRS ||  || align=right | 2.9 km || 
|-id=333 bgcolor=#C2FFFF
| 518333 ||  || — || August 30, 2011 || Haleakala || Pan-STARRS || L5 || align=right | 13 km || 
|-id=334 bgcolor=#d6d6d6
| 518334 ||  || — || October 25, 2009 || Mount Lemmon || Mount Lemmon Survey ||  || align=right | 3.2 km || 
|-id=335 bgcolor=#E9E9E9
| 518335 ||  || — || February 6, 2013 || Catalina || CSS ||  || align=right | 1.9 km || 
|-id=336 bgcolor=#d6d6d6
| 518336 ||  || — || August 15, 2010 || WISE || WISE ||  || align=right | 4.5 km || 
|-id=337 bgcolor=#d6d6d6
| 518337 ||  || — || December 10, 2010 || Mount Lemmon || Mount Lemmon Survey ||  || align=right | 3.1 km || 
|-id=338 bgcolor=#d6d6d6
| 518338 ||  || — || December 25, 2009 || Kitt Peak || Spacewatch || 7:4 || align=right | 3.0 km || 
|-id=339 bgcolor=#fefefe
| 518339 ||  || — || May 21, 2014 || Haleakala || Pan-STARRS ||  || align=right data-sort-value="0.61" | 610 m || 
|-id=340 bgcolor=#fefefe
| 518340 ||  || — || January 10, 2013 || Mount Lemmon || Mount Lemmon Survey ||  || align=right data-sort-value="0.87" | 870 m || 
|-id=341 bgcolor=#d6d6d6
| 518341 ||  || — || January 25, 2006 || Kitt Peak || Spacewatch ||  || align=right | 2.5 km || 
|-id=342 bgcolor=#d6d6d6
| 518342 ||  || — || April 17, 2013 || Haleakala || Pan-STARRS ||  || align=right | 2.7 km || 
|-id=343 bgcolor=#d6d6d6
| 518343 ||  || — || March 26, 2007 || Kitt Peak || Spacewatch ||  || align=right | 2.1 km || 
|-id=344 bgcolor=#d6d6d6
| 518344 ||  || — || September 6, 2008 || Mount Lemmon || Mount Lemmon Survey ||  || align=right | 2.8 km || 
|-id=345 bgcolor=#d6d6d6
| 518345 ||  || — || December 2, 2010 || Kitt Peak || Spacewatch ||  || align=right | 2.8 km || 
|-id=346 bgcolor=#d6d6d6
| 518346 ||  || — || March 25, 2007 || Mount Lemmon || Mount Lemmon Survey ||  || align=right | 3.5 km || 
|-id=347 bgcolor=#d6d6d6
| 518347 ||  || — || September 20, 2014 || Haleakala || Pan-STARRS ||  || align=right | 2.3 km || 
|-id=348 bgcolor=#d6d6d6
| 518348 ||  || — || January 13, 2010 || WISE || WISE ||  || align=right | 2.8 km || 
|-id=349 bgcolor=#d6d6d6
| 518349 ||  || — || March 27, 2012 || Mount Lemmon || Mount Lemmon Survey ||  || align=right | 2.9 km || 
|-id=350 bgcolor=#d6d6d6
| 518350 ||  || — || September 22, 2009 || Kitt Peak || Spacewatch ||  || align=right | 2.9 km || 
|-id=351 bgcolor=#d6d6d6
| 518351 ||  || — || December 31, 1999 || Kitt Peak || Spacewatch ||  || align=right | 2.6 km || 
|-id=352 bgcolor=#E9E9E9
| 518352 ||  || — || April 24, 2009 || Mount Lemmon || Mount Lemmon Survey ||  || align=right | 1.6 km || 
|-id=353 bgcolor=#d6d6d6
| 518353 ||  || — || September 17, 2010 || Mount Lemmon || Mount Lemmon Survey ||  || align=right | 3.3 km || 
|-id=354 bgcolor=#d6d6d6
| 518354 ||  || — || June 27, 2010 || WISE || WISE || 3:2 || align=right | 5.1 km || 
|-id=355 bgcolor=#E9E9E9
| 518355 ||  || — || August 27, 2006 || Kitt Peak || Spacewatch ||  || align=right | 1.1 km || 
|-id=356 bgcolor=#d6d6d6
| 518356 ||  || — || March 18, 2007 || Kitt Peak || Spacewatch ||  || align=right | 3.7 km || 
|-id=357 bgcolor=#d6d6d6
| 518357 ||  || — || June 12, 2007 || Kitt Peak || Spacewatch ||  || align=right | 3.1 km || 
|-id=358 bgcolor=#d6d6d6
| 518358 ||  || — || June 27, 2014 || Haleakala || Pan-STARRS ||  || align=right | 3.3 km || 
|-id=359 bgcolor=#d6d6d6
| 518359 ||  || — || October 14, 2009 || Mount Lemmon || Mount Lemmon Survey ||  || align=right | 4.0 km || 
|-id=360 bgcolor=#C2FFFF
| 518360 ||  || — || December 7, 2015 || Haleakala || Pan-STARRS || L5 || align=right | 7.2 km || 
|-id=361 bgcolor=#E9E9E9
| 518361 ||  || — || October 4, 2006 || Mount Lemmon || Mount Lemmon Survey ||  || align=right | 1.9 km || 
|-id=362 bgcolor=#d6d6d6
| 518362 ||  || — || March 13, 2007 || Kitt Peak || Spacewatch ||  || align=right | 2.8 km || 
|-id=363 bgcolor=#d6d6d6
| 518363 ||  || — || January 31, 2012 || Haleakala || Pan-STARRS ||  || align=right | 3.4 km || 
|-id=364 bgcolor=#d6d6d6
| 518364 ||  || — || June 20, 2013 || Haleakala || Pan-STARRS ||  || align=right | 2.9 km || 
|-id=365 bgcolor=#d6d6d6
| 518365 ||  || — || December 10, 2004 || Kitt Peak || Spacewatch ||  || align=right | 4.5 km || 
|-id=366 bgcolor=#d6d6d6
| 518366 ||  || — || April 15, 2012 || Haleakala || Pan-STARRS ||  || align=right | 3.6 km || 
|-id=367 bgcolor=#d6d6d6
| 518367 ||  || — || August 27, 2009 || Siding Spring || SSS ||  || align=right | 3.9 km || 
|-id=368 bgcolor=#fefefe
| 518368 ||  || — || October 9, 2008 || Mount Lemmon || Mount Lemmon Survey ||  || align=right data-sort-value="0.73" | 730 m || 
|-id=369 bgcolor=#d6d6d6
| 518369 ||  || — || October 2, 2008 || Mount Lemmon || Mount Lemmon Survey || 7:4 || align=right | 3.1 km || 
|-id=370 bgcolor=#E9E9E9
| 518370 ||  || — || January 28, 2003 || Kitt Peak || Spacewatch ||  || align=right | 2.0 km || 
|-id=371 bgcolor=#d6d6d6
| 518371 ||  || — || November 27, 2009 || Kitt Peak || Spacewatch ||  || align=right | 2.8 km || 
|-id=372 bgcolor=#d6d6d6
| 518372 ||  || — || November 10, 2010 || Mount Lemmon || Mount Lemmon Survey ||  || align=right | 3.3 km || 
|-id=373 bgcolor=#d6d6d6
| 518373 ||  || — || January 29, 2012 || Kitt Peak || Spacewatch ||  || align=right | 3.1 km || 
|-id=374 bgcolor=#d6d6d6
| 518374 ||  || — || October 1, 2003 || Kitt Peak || Spacewatch ||  || align=right | 2.6 km || 
|-id=375 bgcolor=#d6d6d6
| 518375 ||  || — || April 27, 2012 || Haleakala || Pan-STARRS ||  || align=right | 2.6 km || 
|-id=376 bgcolor=#d6d6d6
| 518376 ||  || — || January 5, 2006 || Mount Lemmon || Mount Lemmon Survey ||  || align=right | 4.0 km || 
|-id=377 bgcolor=#d6d6d6
| 518377 ||  || — || May 31, 2003 || Kitt Peak || Spacewatch ||  || align=right | 3.2 km || 
|-id=378 bgcolor=#d6d6d6
| 518378 ||  || — || January 27, 2007 || Mount Lemmon || Mount Lemmon Survey ||  || align=right | 2.7 km || 
|-id=379 bgcolor=#E9E9E9
| 518379 ||  || — || December 30, 2007 || Kitt Peak || Spacewatch ||  || align=right | 1.0 km || 
|-id=380 bgcolor=#d6d6d6
| 518380 ||  || — || November 3, 2000 || Kitt Peak || Spacewatch ||  || align=right | 2.6 km || 
|-id=381 bgcolor=#d6d6d6
| 518381 ||  || — || October 7, 2008 || Mount Lemmon || Mount Lemmon Survey ||  || align=right | 2.5 km || 
|-id=382 bgcolor=#E9E9E9
| 518382 ||  || — || November 15, 2001 || Kitt Peak || Spacewatch ||  || align=right | 2.2 km || 
|-id=383 bgcolor=#d6d6d6
| 518383 ||  || — || February 24, 2006 || Kitt Peak || Spacewatch ||  || align=right | 2.6 km || 
|-id=384 bgcolor=#d6d6d6
| 518384 ||  || — || November 19, 2008 || Mount Lemmon || Mount Lemmon Survey ||  || align=right | 3.7 km || 
|-id=385 bgcolor=#d6d6d6
| 518385 ||  || — || October 2, 2013 || Haleakala || Pan-STARRS ||  || align=right | 2.9 km || 
|-id=386 bgcolor=#d6d6d6
| 518386 ||  || — || May 9, 2006 || Mount Lemmon || Mount Lemmon Survey ||  || align=right | 3.2 km || 
|-id=387 bgcolor=#d6d6d6
| 518387 ||  || — || November 7, 2008 || Mount Lemmon || Mount Lemmon Survey ||  || align=right | 2.8 km || 
|-id=388 bgcolor=#d6d6d6
| 518388 ||  || — || October 2, 2008 || Mount Lemmon || Mount Lemmon Survey ||  || align=right | 2.2 km || 
|-id=389 bgcolor=#E9E9E9
| 518389 ||  || — || October 23, 2004 || Kitt Peak || Spacewatch ||  || align=right | 2.1 km || 
|-id=390 bgcolor=#d6d6d6
| 518390 ||  || — || December 30, 2008 || Mount Lemmon || Mount Lemmon Survey ||  || align=right | 3.1 km || 
|-id=391 bgcolor=#E9E9E9
| 518391 ||  || — || August 27, 2009 || Kitt Peak || Spacewatch ||  || align=right | 1.5 km || 
|-id=392 bgcolor=#fefefe
| 518392 ||  || — || August 21, 2006 || Kitt Peak || Spacewatch ||  || align=right | 1.0 km || 
|-id=393 bgcolor=#E9E9E9
| 518393 ||  || — || September 28, 1994 || Kitt Peak || Spacewatch ||  || align=right | 2.7 km || 
|-id=394 bgcolor=#E9E9E9
| 518394 ||  || — || January 11, 2010 || Kitt Peak || Spacewatch ||  || align=right | 2.1 km || 
|-id=395 bgcolor=#E9E9E9
| 518395 ||  || — || March 8, 2010 || WISE || WISE ||  || align=right | 1.5 km || 
|-id=396 bgcolor=#d6d6d6
| 518396 ||  || — || September 1, 1998 || Kitt Peak || Spacewatch ||  || align=right | 2.5 km || 
|-id=397 bgcolor=#E9E9E9
| 518397 ||  || — || February 27, 2006 || Kitt Peak || Spacewatch ||  || align=right | 2.1 km || 
|-id=398 bgcolor=#E9E9E9
| 518398 ||  || — || April 1, 2011 || Mount Lemmon || Mount Lemmon Survey ||  || align=right | 1.1 km || 
|-id=399 bgcolor=#E9E9E9
| 518399 ||  || — || April 28, 2010 || WISE || WISE ||  || align=right | 2.7 km || 
|-id=400 bgcolor=#E9E9E9
| 518400 ||  || — || December 12, 1996 || Kitt Peak || Spacewatch ||  || align=right | 1.0 km || 
|}

518401–518500 

|-bgcolor=#d6d6d6
| 518401 ||  || — || November 7, 2007 || Kitt Peak || Spacewatch ||  || align=right | 2.8 km || 
|-id=402 bgcolor=#d6d6d6
| 518402 ||  || — || February 28, 2008 || Kitt Peak || Spacewatch ||  || align=right | 3.3 km || 
|-id=403 bgcolor=#d6d6d6
| 518403 ||  || — || November 13, 2010 || Mount Lemmon || Mount Lemmon Survey ||  || align=right | 3.4 km || 
|-id=404 bgcolor=#E9E9E9
| 518404 ||  || — || October 11, 2007 || Socorro || LINEAR ||  || align=right | 2.1 km || 
|-id=405 bgcolor=#E9E9E9
| 518405 ||  || — || September 3, 2008 || Kitt Peak || Spacewatch ||  || align=right | 1.1 km || 
|-id=406 bgcolor=#d6d6d6
| 518406 ||  || — || April 12, 1999 || Kitt Peak || Spacewatch ||  || align=right | 2.8 km || 
|-id=407 bgcolor=#E9E9E9
| 518407 ||  || — || April 2, 2006 || Kitt Peak || Spacewatch ||  || align=right | 2.4 km || 
|-id=408 bgcolor=#d6d6d6
| 518408 ||  || — || July 21, 2010 || WISE || WISE ||  || align=right | 3.9 km || 
|-id=409 bgcolor=#d6d6d6
| 518409 ||  || — || April 4, 2008 || Kitt Peak || Spacewatch ||  || align=right | 2.4 km || 
|-id=410 bgcolor=#fefefe
| 518410 ||  || — || May 8, 2005 || Kitt Peak || Spacewatch ||  || align=right data-sort-value="0.66" | 660 m || 
|-id=411 bgcolor=#E9E9E9
| 518411 ||  || — || December 29, 2008 || Mount Lemmon || Mount Lemmon Survey ||  || align=right | 2.7 km || 
|-id=412 bgcolor=#d6d6d6
| 518412 ||  || — || April 13, 2002 || Kitt Peak || Spacewatch ||  || align=right | 3.0 km || 
|-id=413 bgcolor=#fefefe
| 518413 ||  || — || April 3, 2008 || Catalina || CSS || H || align=right data-sort-value="0.83" | 830 m || 
|-id=414 bgcolor=#fefefe
| 518414 ||  || — || March 3, 2005 || Catalina || CSS || H || align=right data-sort-value="0.77" | 770 m || 
|-id=415 bgcolor=#d6d6d6
| 518415 ||  || — || January 27, 2007 || Mount Lemmon || Mount Lemmon Survey ||  || align=right | 2.9 km || 
|-id=416 bgcolor=#d6d6d6
| 518416 ||  || — || September 16, 2004 || Kitt Peak || Spacewatch ||  || align=right | 3.6 km || 
|-id=417 bgcolor=#E9E9E9
| 518417 ||  || — || February 16, 2004 || Socorro || LINEAR ||  || align=right | 2.5 km || 
|-id=418 bgcolor=#FA8072
| 518418 ||  || — || February 12, 2008 || Mount Lemmon || Mount Lemmon Survey || H || align=right data-sort-value="0.52" | 520 m || 
|-id=419 bgcolor=#fefefe
| 518419 ||  || — || February 26, 2007 || Mount Lemmon || Mount Lemmon Survey ||  || align=right data-sort-value="0.85" | 850 m || 
|-id=420 bgcolor=#fefefe
| 518420 ||  || — || June 24, 2011 || Mount Lemmon || Mount Lemmon Survey ||  || align=right data-sort-value="0.86" | 860 m || 
|-id=421 bgcolor=#d6d6d6
| 518421 ||  || — || August 29, 1995 || Kitt Peak || Spacewatch ||  || align=right | 3.4 km || 
|-id=422 bgcolor=#FA8072
| 518422 ||  || — || November 24, 1998 || Kitt Peak || Spacewatch ||  || align=right data-sort-value="0.92" | 920 m || 
|-id=423 bgcolor=#E9E9E9
| 518423 ||  || — || March 14, 2000 || Kitt Peak || Spacewatch ||  || align=right | 2.2 km || 
|-id=424 bgcolor=#FFC2E0
| 518424 ||  || — || November 28, 2000 || Kitt Peak || Spacewatch || AMO +1km || align=right data-sort-value="0.76" | 760 m || 
|-id=425 bgcolor=#fefefe
| 518425 ||  || — || February 7, 2002 || Socorro || LINEAR ||  || align=right | 1.0 km || 
|-id=426 bgcolor=#FFC2E0
| 518426 ||  || — || July 18, 2002 || Socorro || LINEAR || AMO || align=right data-sort-value="0.56" | 560 m || 
|-id=427 bgcolor=#E9E9E9
| 518427 ||  || — || August 17, 2002 || Palomar || NEAT || MAR || align=right data-sort-value="0.88" | 880 m || 
|-id=428 bgcolor=#d6d6d6
| 518428 ||  || — || August 17, 2002 || Palomar || NEAT ||  || align=right | 2.6 km || 
|-id=429 bgcolor=#E9E9E9
| 518429 ||  || — || August 16, 2002 || Palomar || NEAT ||  || align=right | 2.0 km || 
|-id=430 bgcolor=#E9E9E9
| 518430 ||  || — || September 13, 2002 || Palomar || NEAT ||  || align=right | 1.2 km || 
|-id=431 bgcolor=#E9E9E9
| 518431 ||  || — || October 4, 2002 || Socorro || LINEAR ||  || align=right | 1.4 km || 
|-id=432 bgcolor=#fefefe
| 518432 ||  || — || January 5, 2003 || Socorro || LINEAR ||  || align=right | 1.9 km || 
|-id=433 bgcolor=#fefefe
| 518433 ||  || — || April 25, 2003 || Kitt Peak || Spacewatch ||  || align=right data-sort-value="0.65" | 650 m || 
|-id=434 bgcolor=#FA8072
| 518434 ||  || — || August 2, 2003 || Haleakala || NEAT ||  || align=right | 1.1 km || 
|-id=435 bgcolor=#E9E9E9
| 518435 ||  || — || September 28, 2003 || Socorro || LINEAR ||  || align=right | 1.4 km || 
|-id=436 bgcolor=#d6d6d6
| 518436 ||  || — || September 19, 2003 || Kitt Peak || Spacewatch ||  || align=right | 2.1 km || 
|-id=437 bgcolor=#E9E9E9
| 518437 ||  || — || October 3, 2003 || Kitt Peak || Spacewatch ||  || align=right data-sort-value="0.96" | 960 m || 
|-id=438 bgcolor=#d6d6d6
| 518438 ||  || — || November 18, 2003 || Kitt Peak || Spacewatch ||  || align=right | 3.3 km || 
|-id=439 bgcolor=#d6d6d6
| 518439 ||  || — || December 18, 2003 || Kitt Peak || Spacewatch ||  || align=right | 2.2 km || 
|-id=440 bgcolor=#FFC2E0
| 518440 ||  || — || February 11, 2004 || Socorro || LINEAR || APOcritical || align=right data-sort-value="0.47" | 470 m || 
|-id=441 bgcolor=#FA8072
| 518441 ||  || — || February 25, 2004 || Socorro || LINEAR ||  || align=right data-sort-value="0.77" | 770 m || 
|-id=442 bgcolor=#E9E9E9
| 518442 ||  || — || April 13, 2004 || Kitt Peak || Spacewatch ||  || align=right | 2.1 km || 
|-id=443 bgcolor=#E9E9E9
| 518443 ||  || — || April 16, 2004 || Kitt Peak || Spacewatch ||  || align=right | 2.1 km || 
|-id=444 bgcolor=#d6d6d6
| 518444 ||  || — || April 21, 2004 || Kitt Peak || Spacewatch ||  || align=right | 2.5 km || 
|-id=445 bgcolor=#fefefe
| 518445 ||  || — || September 10, 2004 || Socorro || LINEAR ||  || align=right data-sort-value="0.75" | 750 m || 
|-id=446 bgcolor=#E9E9E9
| 518446 ||  || — || September 11, 2004 || Kitt Peak || Spacewatch ||  || align=right | 1.1 km || 
|-id=447 bgcolor=#E9E9E9
| 518447 ||  || — || October 5, 2004 || Kitt Peak || Spacewatch ||  || align=right | 1.0 km || 
|-id=448 bgcolor=#d6d6d6
| 518448 ||  || — || December 2, 2004 || Kitt Peak || Spacewatch ||  || align=right | 3.1 km || 
|-id=449 bgcolor=#d6d6d6
| 518449 ||  || — || December 19, 2004 || Mount Lemmon || Mount Lemmon Survey ||  || align=right | 3.1 km || 
|-id=450 bgcolor=#d6d6d6
| 518450 ||  || — || January 19, 2005 || Kitt Peak || Spacewatch ||  || align=right | 2.5 km || 
|-id=451 bgcolor=#E9E9E9
| 518451 ||  || — || March 12, 2005 || Kitt Peak || Spacewatch ||  || align=right | 1.2 km || 
|-id=452 bgcolor=#FA8072
| 518452 ||  || — || March 14, 2005 || Mount Lemmon || Mount Lemmon Survey ||  || align=right data-sort-value="0.81" | 810 m || 
|-id=453 bgcolor=#fefefe
| 518453 ||  || — || March 12, 2005 || Kitt Peak || Spacewatch ||  || align=right data-sort-value="0.70" | 700 m || 
|-id=454 bgcolor=#d6d6d6
| 518454 ||  || — || March 12, 2005 || Kitt Peak || Spacewatch ||  || align=right | 2.6 km || 
|-id=455 bgcolor=#fefefe
| 518455 ||  || — || April 2, 2005 || Mount Lemmon || Mount Lemmon Survey || H || align=right data-sort-value="0.53" | 530 m || 
|-id=456 bgcolor=#E9E9E9
| 518456 ||  || — || April 12, 2005 || Kitt Peak || Spacewatch || ADE || align=right | 1.7 km || 
|-id=457 bgcolor=#fefefe
| 518457 ||  || — || April 6, 2005 || Kitt Peak || Spacewatch || H || align=right data-sort-value="0.54" | 540 m || 
|-id=458 bgcolor=#E9E9E9
| 518458 Roblambert ||  ||  || April 10, 2005 || Kitt Peak || M. W. Buie || (10369) || align=right | 1.2 km || 
|-id=459 bgcolor=#fefefe
| 518459 ||  || — || April 7, 2005 || Kitt Peak || Spacewatch ||  || align=right data-sort-value="0.65" | 650 m || 
|-id=460 bgcolor=#E9E9E9
| 518460 ||  || — || April 30, 2005 || Kitt Peak || Spacewatch ||  || align=right | 1.5 km || 
|-id=461 bgcolor=#E9E9E9
| 518461 ||  || — || May 1, 2005 || Kitt Peak || Spacewatch ||  || align=right | 1.6 km || 
|-id=462 bgcolor=#E9E9E9
| 518462 ||  || — || May 8, 2005 || Kitt Peak || Spacewatch ||  || align=right | 1.6 km || 
|-id=463 bgcolor=#FFC2E0
| 518463 ||  || — || May 11, 2005 || Catalina || CSS || AMO +1km || align=right | 1.5 km || 
|-id=464 bgcolor=#E9E9E9
| 518464 ||  || — || May 10, 2005 || Kitt Peak || Spacewatch ||  || align=right | 1.3 km || 
|-id=465 bgcolor=#E9E9E9
| 518465 ||  || — || May 3, 2005 || Kitt Peak || Spacewatch ||  || align=right | 1.4 km || 
|-id=466 bgcolor=#fefefe
| 518466 ||  || — || May 8, 2005 || Kitt Peak || Spacewatch || H || align=right data-sort-value="0.59" | 590 m || 
|-id=467 bgcolor=#fefefe
| 518467 ||  || — || May 16, 2005 || Kitt Peak || Spacewatch ||  || align=right data-sort-value="0.85" | 850 m || 
|-id=468 bgcolor=#fefefe
| 518468 ||  || — || May 20, 2005 || Mount Lemmon || Mount Lemmon Survey ||  || align=right data-sort-value="0.85" | 850 m || 
|-id=469 bgcolor=#FFC2E0
| 518469 ||  || — || June 7, 2005 || Siding Spring || SSS || AMO || align=right data-sort-value="0.65" | 650 m || 
|-id=470 bgcolor=#E9E9E9
| 518470 ||  || — || August 8, 2005 || Great Shefford || Great Shefford Obs. ||  || align=right | 2.1 km || 
|-id=471 bgcolor=#E9E9E9
| 518471 ||  || — || August 25, 2005 || Campo Imperatore || CINEOS ||  || align=right | 1.8 km || 
|-id=472 bgcolor=#d6d6d6
| 518472 ||  || — || August 30, 2005 || Kitt Peak || Spacewatch ||  || align=right | 2.1 km || 
|-id=473 bgcolor=#d6d6d6
| 518473 ||  || — || August 31, 2005 || Kitt Peak || Spacewatch ||  || align=right | 3.2 km || 
|-id=474 bgcolor=#d6d6d6
| 518474 ||  || — || September 1, 2005 || Kitt Peak || Spacewatch || 7:4 || align=right | 2.9 km || 
|-id=475 bgcolor=#E9E9E9
| 518475 ||  || — || September 1, 2005 || Kitt Peak || Spacewatch ||  || align=right | 2.0 km || 
|-id=476 bgcolor=#d6d6d6
| 518476 ||  || — || September 12, 2005 || Kitt Peak || Spacewatch ||  || align=right | 3.0 km || 
|-id=477 bgcolor=#fefefe
| 518477 ||  || — || September 11, 2005 || Socorro || LINEAR ||  || align=right data-sort-value="0.75" | 750 m || 
|-id=478 bgcolor=#fefefe
| 518478 ||  || — || September 30, 2005 || Catalina || CSS ||  || align=right data-sort-value="0.96" | 960 m || 
|-id=479 bgcolor=#d6d6d6
| 518479 ||  || — || September 30, 2005 || Mount Lemmon || Mount Lemmon Survey ||  || align=right | 2.7 km || 
|-id=480 bgcolor=#fefefe
| 518480 ||  || — || September 21, 2005 || Apache Point || A. C. Becker ||  || align=right data-sort-value="0.82" | 820 m || 
|-id=481 bgcolor=#d6d6d6
| 518481 ||  || — || September 27, 2005 || Kitt Peak || Spacewatch ||  || align=right | 2.5 km || 
|-id=482 bgcolor=#FA8072
| 518482 ||  || — || September 9, 2005 || Socorro || LINEAR ||  || align=right data-sort-value="0.83" | 830 m || 
|-id=483 bgcolor=#fefefe
| 518483 ||  || — || October 1, 2005 || Catalina || CSS ||  || align=right data-sort-value="0.93" | 930 m || 
|-id=484 bgcolor=#fefefe
| 518484 ||  || — || October 1, 2005 || Kitt Peak || Spacewatch ||  || align=right data-sort-value="0.85" | 850 m || 
|-id=485 bgcolor=#fefefe
| 518485 ||  || — || October 22, 2005 || Kitt Peak || Spacewatch ||  || align=right data-sort-value="0.75" | 750 m || 
|-id=486 bgcolor=#fefefe
| 518486 ||  || — || October 22, 2005 || Kitt Peak || Spacewatch ||  || align=right data-sort-value="0.67" | 670 m || 
|-id=487 bgcolor=#fefefe
| 518487 ||  || — || October 25, 2005 || Kitt Peak || Spacewatch ||  || align=right data-sort-value="0.84" | 840 m || 
|-id=488 bgcolor=#d6d6d6
| 518488 ||  || — || October 29, 2005 || Kitt Peak || Spacewatch ||  || align=right | 3.0 km || 
|-id=489 bgcolor=#E9E9E9
| 518489 ||  || — || November 5, 2005 || Kitt Peak || Spacewatch ||  || align=right data-sort-value="0.67" | 670 m || 
|-id=490 bgcolor=#d6d6d6
| 518490 ||  || — || November 25, 2005 || Kitt Peak || Spacewatch || EOS || align=right | 1.7 km || 
|-id=491 bgcolor=#E9E9E9
| 518491 ||  || — || December 5, 2005 || Kitt Peak || Spacewatch ||  || align=right | 1.1 km || 
|-id=492 bgcolor=#E9E9E9
| 518492 ||  || — || December 8, 2005 || Kitt Peak || Spacewatch ||  || align=right | 1.0 km || 
|-id=493 bgcolor=#d6d6d6
| 518493 ||  || — || December 22, 2005 || Kitt Peak || Spacewatch ||  || align=right | 2.7 km || 
|-id=494 bgcolor=#d6d6d6
| 518494 ||  || — || November 29, 2005 || Mount Lemmon || Mount Lemmon Survey ||  || align=right | 3.1 km || 
|-id=495 bgcolor=#d6d6d6
| 518495 ||  || — || December 26, 2005 || Kitt Peak || Spacewatch ||  || align=right | 2.5 km || 
|-id=496 bgcolor=#d6d6d6
| 518496 ||  || — || December 30, 2005 || Kitt Peak || Spacewatch ||  || align=right | 2.3 km || 
|-id=497 bgcolor=#d6d6d6
| 518497 ||  || — || December 30, 2005 || Kitt Peak || Spacewatch ||  || align=right | 2.2 km || 
|-id=498 bgcolor=#d6d6d6
| 518498 ||  || — || December 25, 2005 || Kitt Peak || Spacewatch ||  || align=right | 2.5 km || 
|-id=499 bgcolor=#E9E9E9
| 518499 ||  || — || December 28, 2005 || Kitt Peak || Spacewatch ||  || align=right | 1.1 km || 
|-id=500 bgcolor=#fefefe
| 518500 ||  || — || January 20, 2006 || Kitt Peak || Spacewatch ||  || align=right data-sort-value="0.73" | 730 m || 
|}

518501–518600 

|-bgcolor=#fefefe
| 518501 ||  || — || January 27, 2006 || Kitt Peak || Spacewatch || NYS || align=right data-sort-value="0.66" | 660 m || 
|-id=502 bgcolor=#d6d6d6
| 518502 ||  || — || January 23, 2006 || Kitt Peak || Spacewatch || EOS || align=right | 2.1 km || 
|-id=503 bgcolor=#fefefe
| 518503 ||  || — || January 31, 2006 || Kitt Peak || Spacewatch ||  || align=right data-sort-value="0.71" | 710 m || 
|-id=504 bgcolor=#fefefe
| 518504 ||  || — || February 21, 2006 || Mount Lemmon || Mount Lemmon Survey ||  || align=right data-sort-value="0.75" | 750 m || 
|-id=505 bgcolor=#fefefe
| 518505 ||  || — || February 25, 2006 || Kitt Peak || Spacewatch ||  || align=right data-sort-value="0.68" | 680 m || 
|-id=506 bgcolor=#E9E9E9
| 518506 ||  || — || February 25, 2006 || Kitt Peak || Spacewatch ||  || align=right | 1.8 km || 
|-id=507 bgcolor=#FFC2E0
| 518507 ||  || — || March 5, 2006 || Socorro || LINEAR || APO || align=right data-sort-value="0.79" | 790 m || 
|-id=508 bgcolor=#E9E9E9
| 518508 ||  || — || March 2, 2006 || Kitt Peak || Spacewatch ||  || align=right data-sort-value="0.97" | 970 m || 
|-id=509 bgcolor=#B88A00
| 518509 ||  || — || March 27, 2006 || Siding Spring || SSS || unusual || align=right | 2.3 km || 
|-id=510 bgcolor=#E9E9E9
| 518510 ||  || — || April 25, 2006 || Kitt Peak || Spacewatch ||  || align=right | 1.6 km || 
|-id=511 bgcolor=#E9E9E9
| 518511 ||  || — || April 24, 2006 || Kitt Peak || Spacewatch ||  || align=right | 2.4 km || 
|-id=512 bgcolor=#E9E9E9
| 518512 ||  || — || May 7, 2006 || Kitt Peak || Spacewatch ||  || align=right data-sort-value="0.90" | 900 m || 
|-id=513 bgcolor=#d6d6d6
| 518513 ||  || — || May 7, 2006 || Kitt Peak || Spacewatch ||  || align=right | 2.7 km || 
|-id=514 bgcolor=#E9E9E9
| 518514 ||  || — || May 6, 2006 || Mount Lemmon || Mount Lemmon Survey ||  || align=right data-sort-value="0.68" | 680 m || 
|-id=515 bgcolor=#E9E9E9
| 518515 ||  || — || May 25, 2006 || Kitt Peak || Spacewatch ||  || align=right data-sort-value="0.68" | 680 m || 
|-id=516 bgcolor=#E9E9E9
| 518516 ||  || — || July 25, 2006 || Mount Lemmon || Mount Lemmon Survey ||  || align=right | 1.3 km || 
|-id=517 bgcolor=#E9E9E9
| 518517 ||  || — || August 30, 2006 || Anderson Mesa || LONEOS || ADE || align=right | 2.4 km || 
|-id=518 bgcolor=#d6d6d6
| 518518 ||  || — || August 19, 2006 || Kitt Peak || Spacewatch ||  || align=right | 2.2 km || 
|-id=519 bgcolor=#E9E9E9
| 518519 ||  || — || August 28, 2006 || Kitt Peak || Spacewatch ||  || align=right | 1.7 km || 
|-id=520 bgcolor=#d6d6d6
| 518520 ||  || — || August 28, 2006 || Kitt Peak || Spacewatch ||  || align=right | 2.6 km || 
|-id=521 bgcolor=#E9E9E9
| 518521 ||  || — || August 29, 2006 || Kitt Peak || Spacewatch ||  || align=right | 1.9 km || 
|-id=522 bgcolor=#E9E9E9
| 518522 ||  || — || August 29, 2006 || Anderson Mesa || LONEOS ||  || align=right | 1.4 km || 
|-id=523 bgcolor=#E9E9E9
| 518523 Bryanshumaker ||  ||  || September 16, 2006 || Vail-Jarnac || D. H. Levy, T. Glinos ||  || align=right | 1.7 km || 
|-id=524 bgcolor=#E9E9E9
| 518524 ||  || — || September 16, 2006 || Catalina || CSS ||  || align=right | 1.1 km || 
|-id=525 bgcolor=#E9E9E9
| 518525 ||  || — || September 18, 2006 || Kitt Peak || Spacewatch ||  || align=right | 1.2 km || 
|-id=526 bgcolor=#E9E9E9
| 518526 ||  || — || September 20, 2006 || Palomar || NEAT ||  || align=right | 2.5 km || 
|-id=527 bgcolor=#E9E9E9
| 518527 ||  || — || September 18, 2006 || Kitt Peak || Spacewatch ||  || align=right | 1.9 km || 
|-id=528 bgcolor=#FA8072
| 518528 ||  || — || September 17, 2006 || Socorro || LINEAR ||  || align=right | 2.8 km || 
|-id=529 bgcolor=#E9E9E9
| 518529 ||  || — || September 28, 2006 || Kitt Peak || Spacewatch ||  || align=right | 2.2 km || 
|-id=530 bgcolor=#d6d6d6
| 518530 ||  || — || September 19, 2006 || Kitt Peak || Spacewatch ||  || align=right | 2.4 km || 
|-id=531 bgcolor=#d6d6d6
| 518531 ||  || — || September 19, 2006 || Kitt Peak || Spacewatch ||  || align=right | 2.5 km || 
|-id=532 bgcolor=#E9E9E9
| 518532 ||  || — || October 12, 2006 || Kitt Peak || Spacewatch ||  || align=right | 1.3 km || 
|-id=533 bgcolor=#E9E9E9
| 518533 ||  || — || October 11, 2006 || Palomar || NEAT ||  || align=right | 1.6 km || 
|-id=534 bgcolor=#E9E9E9
| 518534 ||  || — || October 13, 2006 || Kitt Peak || Spacewatch ||  || align=right | 1.4 km || 
|-id=535 bgcolor=#E9E9E9
| 518535 ||  || — || October 16, 2006 || Catalina || CSS ||  || align=right | 1.1 km || 
|-id=536 bgcolor=#fefefe
| 518536 ||  || — || October 23, 2006 || Kitt Peak || Spacewatch ||  || align=right data-sort-value="0.57" | 570 m || 
|-id=537 bgcolor=#E9E9E9
| 518537 ||  || — || October 28, 2006 || Mount Lemmon || Mount Lemmon Survey ||  || align=right | 1.9 km || 
|-id=538 bgcolor=#fefefe
| 518538 ||  || — || October 20, 2006 || Kitt Peak || Spacewatch ||  || align=right data-sort-value="0.62" | 620 m || 
|-id=539 bgcolor=#d6d6d6
| 518539 ||  || — || October 20, 2006 || Kitt Peak || Spacewatch ||  || align=right | 2.3 km || 
|-id=540 bgcolor=#d6d6d6
| 518540 ||  || — || October 22, 2006 || Kitt Peak || Spacewatch ||  || align=right | 2.0 km || 
|-id=541 bgcolor=#E9E9E9
| 518541 ||  || — || October 22, 2006 || Mount Lemmon || Mount Lemmon Survey || HOF || align=right | 2.1 km || 
|-id=542 bgcolor=#FA8072
| 518542 ||  || — || November 12, 2006 || Mount Lemmon || Mount Lemmon Survey ||  || align=right data-sort-value="0.59" | 590 m || 
|-id=543 bgcolor=#fefefe
| 518543 ||  || — || November 19, 2006 || Kitt Peak || Spacewatch ||  || align=right data-sort-value="0.82" | 820 m || 
|-id=544 bgcolor=#E9E9E9
| 518544 ||  || — || November 19, 2006 || Kitt Peak || Spacewatch ||  || align=right | 2.1 km || 
|-id=545 bgcolor=#E9E9E9
| 518545 ||  || — || November 17, 2006 || Kitt Peak || Spacewatch ||  || align=right | 1.1 km || 
|-id=546 bgcolor=#d6d6d6
| 518546 ||  || — || November 17, 2006 || Kitt Peak || Spacewatch ||  || align=right | 2.7 km || 
|-id=547 bgcolor=#d6d6d6
| 518547 ||  || — || November 20, 2006 || Kitt Peak || Spacewatch ||  || align=right | 3.1 km || 
|-id=548 bgcolor=#d6d6d6
| 518548 ||  || — || December 13, 2006 || Mount Lemmon || Mount Lemmon Survey ||  || align=right | 2.8 km || 
|-id=549 bgcolor=#E9E9E9
| 518549 ||  || — || November 23, 2006 || Mount Lemmon || Mount Lemmon Survey ||  || align=right | 2.2 km || 
|-id=550 bgcolor=#fefefe
| 518550 ||  || — || December 26, 2006 || Kitt Peak || Spacewatch ||  || align=right data-sort-value="0.90" | 900 m || 
|-id=551 bgcolor=#fefefe
| 518551 ||  || — || December 27, 2006 || Mount Lemmon || Mount Lemmon Survey || H || align=right data-sort-value="0.65" | 650 m || 
|-id=552 bgcolor=#d6d6d6
| 518552 ||  || — || September 30, 2005 || Anderson Mesa || LONEOS ||  || align=right | 3.4 km || 
|-id=553 bgcolor=#fefefe
| 518553 ||  || — || February 17, 2007 || Kitt Peak || Spacewatch ||  || align=right data-sort-value="0.68" | 680 m || 
|-id=554 bgcolor=#fefefe
| 518554 ||  || — || February 17, 2007 || Mount Lemmon || Mount Lemmon Survey ||  || align=right data-sort-value="0.61" | 610 m || 
|-id=555 bgcolor=#E9E9E9
| 518555 ||  || — || February 25, 2007 || Kitt Peak || Spacewatch ||  || align=right data-sort-value="0.76" | 760 m || 
|-id=556 bgcolor=#d6d6d6
| 518556 ||  || — || March 9, 2007 || Mount Lemmon || Mount Lemmon Survey ||  || align=right | 2.0 km || 
|-id=557 bgcolor=#fefefe
| 518557 ||  || — || February 27, 2007 || Kitt Peak || Spacewatch ||  || align=right data-sort-value="0.69" | 690 m || 
|-id=558 bgcolor=#d6d6d6
| 518558 ||  || — || March 14, 2007 || Kitt Peak || Spacewatch || EOS || align=right | 1.6 km || 
|-id=559 bgcolor=#d6d6d6
| 518559 ||  || — || March 14, 2007 || Kitt Peak || Spacewatch ||  || align=right | 2.5 km || 
|-id=560 bgcolor=#fefefe
| 518560 ||  || — || March 15, 2007 || Kitt Peak || Spacewatch || NYS || align=right data-sort-value="0.52" | 520 m || 
|-id=561 bgcolor=#d6d6d6
| 518561 ||  || — || March 15, 2007 || Kitt Peak || Spacewatch ||  || align=right | 3.4 km || 
|-id=562 bgcolor=#fefefe
| 518562 ||  || — || February 17, 2007 || Kitt Peak || Spacewatch ||  || align=right data-sort-value="0.66" | 660 m || 
|-id=563 bgcolor=#fefefe
| 518563 ||  || — || March 20, 2007 || Catalina || CSS ||  || align=right data-sort-value="0.86" | 860 m || 
|-id=564 bgcolor=#fefefe
| 518564 ||  || — || March 13, 2007 || Mount Lemmon || Mount Lemmon Survey ||  || align=right data-sort-value="0.75" | 750 m || 
|-id=565 bgcolor=#fefefe
| 518565 ||  || — || March 11, 2003 || Campo Imperatore || CINEOS ||  || align=right | 1.2 km || 
|-id=566 bgcolor=#fefefe
| 518566 ||  || — || February 22, 2003 || Kitt Peak || Spacewatch || NYS || align=right data-sort-value="0.53" | 530 m || 
|-id=567 bgcolor=#fefefe
| 518567 ||  || — || April 22, 2007 || Kitt Peak || Spacewatch ||  || align=right data-sort-value="0.80" | 800 m || 
|-id=568 bgcolor=#FA8072
| 518568 ||  || — || April 23, 2007 || Kitt Peak || Spacewatch ||  || align=right data-sort-value="0.71" | 710 m || 
|-id=569 bgcolor=#fefefe
| 518569 ||  || — || April 14, 2007 || Kitt Peak || Spacewatch ||  || align=right data-sort-value="0.67" | 670 m || 
|-id=570 bgcolor=#fefefe
| 518570 ||  || — || April 14, 2007 || Kitt Peak || Spacewatch ||  || align=right data-sort-value="0.73" | 730 m || 
|-id=571 bgcolor=#d6d6d6
| 518571 ||  || — || April 14, 2007 || Mount Lemmon || Mount Lemmon Survey ||  || align=right | 2.0 km || 
|-id=572 bgcolor=#d6d6d6
| 518572 ||  || — || March 9, 2007 || Mount Lemmon || Mount Lemmon Survey ||  || align=right | 2.2 km || 
|-id=573 bgcolor=#E9E9E9
| 518573 ||  || — || April 19, 2007 || Mount Lemmon || Mount Lemmon Survey ||  || align=right | 1.5 km || 
|-id=574 bgcolor=#E9E9E9
| 518574 ||  || — || April 22, 2007 || Kitt Peak || Spacewatch ||  || align=right | 2.0 km || 
|-id=575 bgcolor=#E9E9E9
| 518575 ||  || — || April 20, 2007 || Mount Lemmon || Mount Lemmon Survey ||  || align=right data-sort-value="0.92" | 920 m || 
|-id=576 bgcolor=#E9E9E9
| 518576 ||  || — || May 11, 2007 || Mount Lemmon || Mount Lemmon Survey ||  || align=right | 2.3 km || 
|-id=577 bgcolor=#d6d6d6
| 518577 ||  || — || March 28, 2007 || Siding Spring || SSS ||  || align=right | 3.9 km || 
|-id=578 bgcolor=#d6d6d6
| 518578 ||  || — || June 13, 2007 || Kitt Peak || Spacewatch ||  || align=right | 3.0 km || 
|-id=579 bgcolor=#d6d6d6
| 518579 ||  || — || April 25, 2007 || Mount Lemmon || Mount Lemmon Survey ||  || align=right | 3.2 km || 
|-id=580 bgcolor=#d6d6d6
| 518580 ||  || — || April 15, 2007 || Kitt Peak || Spacewatch ||  || align=right | 2.8 km || 
|-id=581 bgcolor=#d6d6d6
| 518581 ||  || — || August 10, 2007 || Kitt Peak || Spacewatch ||  || align=right | 2.0 km || 
|-id=582 bgcolor=#d6d6d6
| 518582 ||  || — || May 7, 2006 || Kitt Peak || Spacewatch ||  || align=right | 3.0 km || 
|-id=583 bgcolor=#d6d6d6
| 518583 ||  || — || October 9, 2007 || Kitt Peak || Spacewatch ||  || align=right | 2.3 km || 
|-id=584 bgcolor=#E9E9E9
| 518584 ||  || — || October 10, 2007 || Mount Lemmon || Mount Lemmon Survey ||  || align=right | 2.4 km || 
|-id=585 bgcolor=#d6d6d6
| 518585 ||  || — || October 11, 2007 || Kitt Peak || Spacewatch ||  || align=right | 3.1 km || 
|-id=586 bgcolor=#d6d6d6
| 518586 ||  || — || October 12, 2007 || Kitt Peak || Spacewatch ||  || align=right | 1.8 km || 
|-id=587 bgcolor=#fefefe
| 518587 ||  || — || October 6, 2007 || Kitt Peak || Spacewatch ||  || align=right data-sort-value="0.71" | 710 m || 
|-id=588 bgcolor=#d6d6d6
| 518588 ||  || — || October 14, 2007 || Mount Lemmon || Mount Lemmon Survey ||  || align=right | 2.7 km || 
|-id=589 bgcolor=#d6d6d6
| 518589 ||  || — || October 18, 2007 || Kitt Peak || Spacewatch ||  || align=right | 3.7 km || 
|-id=590 bgcolor=#E9E9E9
| 518590 ||  || — || November 3, 2007 || Kitt Peak || Spacewatch ||  || align=right | 1.4 km || 
|-id=591 bgcolor=#E9E9E9
| 518591 ||  || — || November 3, 2007 || Kitt Peak || Spacewatch ||  || align=right | 1.7 km || 
|-id=592 bgcolor=#d6d6d6
| 518592 ||  || — || November 2, 2007 || Kitt Peak || Spacewatch ||  || align=right | 2.1 km || 
|-id=593 bgcolor=#d6d6d6
| 518593 ||  || — || November 2, 2007 || Kitt Peak || Spacewatch ||  || align=right | 2.4 km || 
|-id=594 bgcolor=#fefefe
| 518594 ||  || — || November 2, 2007 || Kitt Peak || Spacewatch ||  || align=right data-sort-value="0.87" | 870 m || 
|-id=595 bgcolor=#E9E9E9
| 518595 ||  || — || November 3, 2007 || Kitt Peak || Spacewatch ||  || align=right | 2.0 km || 
|-id=596 bgcolor=#E9E9E9
| 518596 ||  || — || November 3, 2007 || Kitt Peak || Spacewatch ||  || align=right data-sort-value="0.95" | 950 m || 
|-id=597 bgcolor=#d6d6d6
| 518597 ||  || — || September 10, 2007 || Mount Lemmon || Mount Lemmon Survey ||  || align=right | 2.9 km || 
|-id=598 bgcolor=#d6d6d6
| 518598 ||  || — || November 7, 2007 || Kitt Peak || Spacewatch ||  || align=right | 2.6 km || 
|-id=599 bgcolor=#d6d6d6
| 518599 ||  || — || November 9, 2007 || Kitt Peak || Spacewatch ||  || align=right | 2.6 km || 
|-id=600 bgcolor=#E9E9E9
| 518600 ||  || — || November 9, 2007 || Kitt Peak || Spacewatch ||  || align=right | 1.7 km || 
|}

518601–518700 

|-bgcolor=#d6d6d6
| 518601 ||  || — || November 12, 2007 || Mount Lemmon || Mount Lemmon Survey ||  || align=right | 2.2 km || 
|-id=602 bgcolor=#E9E9E9
| 518602 ||  || — || November 13, 2007 || Kitt Peak || Spacewatch ||  || align=right | 2.2 km || 
|-id=603 bgcolor=#E9E9E9
| 518603 ||  || — || September 17, 2006 || Kitt Peak || Spacewatch ||  || align=right | 1.8 km || 
|-id=604 bgcolor=#E9E9E9
| 518604 ||  || — || November 11, 2007 || Socorro || LINEAR ||  || align=right | 2.0 km || 
|-id=605 bgcolor=#d6d6d6
| 518605 ||  || — || December 17, 2007 || Kitt Peak || Spacewatch ||  || align=right | 2.1 km || 
|-id=606 bgcolor=#fefefe
| 518606 ||  || — || December 30, 2007 || Kitt Peak || Spacewatch ||  || align=right data-sort-value="0.86" | 860 m || 
|-id=607 bgcolor=#d6d6d6
| 518607 ||  || — || December 31, 2007 || Kitt Peak || Spacewatch ||  || align=right | 2.0 km || 
|-id=608 bgcolor=#E9E9E9
| 518608 ||  || — || December 31, 2007 || Kitt Peak || Spacewatch ||  || align=right | 1.1 km || 
|-id=609 bgcolor=#d6d6d6
| 518609 ||  || — || January 11, 2008 || Kitt Peak || Spacewatch || KOR || align=right | 1.1 km || 
|-id=610 bgcolor=#E9E9E9
| 518610 ||  || — || November 3, 2011 || Kitt Peak || Spacewatch ||  || align=right | 1.7 km || 
|-id=611 bgcolor=#E9E9E9
| 518611 ||  || — || January 15, 2008 || Kitt Peak || Spacewatch ||  || align=right | 2.0 km || 
|-id=612 bgcolor=#E9E9E9
| 518612 ||  || — || February 1, 1995 || Kitt Peak || Spacewatch || WIT || align=right | 1.0 km || 
|-id=613 bgcolor=#d6d6d6
| 518613 ||  || — || January 11, 2008 || Kitt Peak || Spacewatch || 3:2 || align=right | 4.0 km || 
|-id=614 bgcolor=#d6d6d6
| 518614 ||  || — || January 1, 2008 || Kitt Peak || Spacewatch ||  || align=right | 2.7 km || 
|-id=615 bgcolor=#d6d6d6
| 518615 ||  || — || January 10, 2008 || Kitt Peak || Spacewatch ||  || align=right | 3.4 km || 
|-id=616 bgcolor=#d6d6d6
| 518616 ||  || — || October 2, 2006 || Mount Lemmon || Mount Lemmon Survey ||  || align=right | 2.7 km || 
|-id=617 bgcolor=#fefefe
| 518617 ||  || — || April 10, 2005 || Kitt Peak || Spacewatch ||  || align=right data-sort-value="0.56" | 560 m || 
|-id=618 bgcolor=#E9E9E9
| 518618 ||  || — || February 1, 2008 || Kitt Peak || Spacewatch ||  || align=right data-sort-value="0.92" | 920 m || 
|-id=619 bgcolor=#d6d6d6
| 518619 ||  || — || February 7, 2008 || Kitt Peak || Spacewatch ||  || align=right | 2.5 km || 
|-id=620 bgcolor=#d6d6d6
| 518620 ||  || — || August 28, 2005 || Kitt Peak || Spacewatch ||  || align=right | 2.9 km || 
|-id=621 bgcolor=#d6d6d6
| 518621 ||  || — || February 8, 2008 || Kitt Peak || Spacewatch ||  || align=right | 2.5 km || 
|-id=622 bgcolor=#fefefe
| 518622 ||  || — || February 13, 2008 || Kitt Peak || Spacewatch ||  || align=right data-sort-value="0.65" | 650 m || 
|-id=623 bgcolor=#d6d6d6
| 518623 ||  || — || February 13, 2008 || Kitt Peak || Spacewatch ||  || align=right | 2.3 km || 
|-id=624 bgcolor=#d6d6d6
| 518624 ||  || — || February 28, 2008 || Kitt Peak || Spacewatch ||  || align=right | 2.3 km || 
|-id=625 bgcolor=#fefefe
| 518625 ||  || — || March 10, 2008 || Kitt Peak || Spacewatch ||  || align=right data-sort-value="0.68" | 680 m || 
|-id=626 bgcolor=#E9E9E9
| 518626 ||  || — || March 10, 2008 || Kitt Peak || Spacewatch ||  || align=right | 1.1 km || 
|-id=627 bgcolor=#E9E9E9
| 518627 ||  || — || September 27, 2005 || Kitt Peak || Spacewatch ||  || align=right data-sort-value="0.97" | 970 m || 
|-id=628 bgcolor=#fefefe
| 518628 ||  || — || October 20, 2006 || Kitt Peak || Spacewatch ||  || align=right data-sort-value="0.62" | 620 m || 
|-id=629 bgcolor=#fefefe
| 518629 ||  || — || March 30, 2008 || Kitt Peak || Spacewatch ||  || align=right data-sort-value="0.84" | 840 m || 
|-id=630 bgcolor=#fefefe
| 518630 ||  || — || April 6, 2008 || Mount Lemmon || Mount Lemmon Survey ||  || align=right data-sort-value="0.72" | 720 m || 
|-id=631 bgcolor=#fefefe
| 518631 ||  || — || April 7, 2008 || Kitt Peak || Spacewatch ||  || align=right data-sort-value="0.66" | 660 m || 
|-id=632 bgcolor=#d6d6d6
| 518632 ||  || — || April 11, 2008 || Mount Lemmon || Mount Lemmon Survey ||  || align=right | 2.8 km || 
|-id=633 bgcolor=#d6d6d6
| 518633 ||  || — || January 25, 2007 || Kitt Peak || Spacewatch ||  || align=right | 2.2 km || 
|-id=634 bgcolor=#fefefe
| 518634 ||  || — || April 5, 2008 || Kitt Peak || Spacewatch ||  || align=right data-sort-value="0.59" | 590 m || 
|-id=635 bgcolor=#FFC2E0
| 518635 ||  || — || April 29, 2008 || Mount Lemmon || Mount Lemmon Survey || AMO +1kmcritical || align=right data-sort-value="0.85" | 850 m || 
|-id=636 bgcolor=#fefefe
| 518636 ||  || — || April 26, 2008 || Kitt Peak || Spacewatch ||  || align=right data-sort-value="0.92" | 920 m || 
|-id=637 bgcolor=#fefefe
| 518637 ||  || — || May 2, 2008 || Kitt Peak || Spacewatch ||  || align=right data-sort-value="0.66" | 660 m || 
|-id=638 bgcolor=#FFC2E0
| 518638 ||  || — || May 1, 2008 || Catalina || CSS || APO || align=right data-sort-value="0.49" | 490 m || 
|-id=639 bgcolor=#E9E9E9
| 518639 ||  || — || May 5, 2008 || Mount Lemmon || Mount Lemmon Survey ||  || align=right data-sort-value="0.94" | 940 m || 
|-id=640 bgcolor=#FFC2E0
| 518640 ||  || — || May 29, 2008 || Kitt Peak || Spacewatch || APOPHAfast? || align=right data-sort-value="0.34" | 340 m || 
|-id=641 bgcolor=#fefefe
| 518641 ||  || — || June 30, 2008 || Kitt Peak || Spacewatch ||  || align=right data-sort-value="0.70" | 700 m || 
|-id=642 bgcolor=#d6d6d6
| 518642 ||  || — || July 29, 2008 || Kitt Peak || Spacewatch ||  || align=right | 2.2 km || 
|-id=643 bgcolor=#d6d6d6
| 518643 ||  || — || July 30, 2008 || Mount Lemmon || Mount Lemmon Survey ||  || align=right | 2.7 km || 
|-id=644 bgcolor=#fefefe
| 518644 ||  || — || July 26, 2008 || Siding Spring || SSS ||  || align=right data-sort-value="0.62" | 620 m || 
|-id=645 bgcolor=#FA8072
| 518645 ||  || — || July 30, 2008 || Mount Lemmon || Mount Lemmon Survey ||  || align=right data-sort-value="0.52" | 520 m || 
|-id=646 bgcolor=#FFC2E0
| 518646 ||  || — || August 23, 2008 || Siding Spring || SSS || AMO || align=right data-sort-value="0.56" | 560 m || 
|-id=647 bgcolor=#d6d6d6
| 518647 ||  || — || August 24, 2008 || Socorro || LINEAR ||  || align=right | 3.3 km || 
|-id=648 bgcolor=#E9E9E9
| 518648 ||  || — || September 4, 2008 || Kitt Peak || Spacewatch ||  || align=right | 1.8 km || 
|-id=649 bgcolor=#d6d6d6
| 518649 ||  || — || August 5, 2008 || La Sagra || OAM Obs. ||  || align=right | 3.1 km || 
|-id=650 bgcolor=#d6d6d6
| 518650 ||  || — || September 4, 2008 || Kitt Peak || Spacewatch || THM || align=right | 2.2 km || 
|-id=651 bgcolor=#fefefe
| 518651 ||  || — || September 6, 2008 || Kitt Peak || Spacewatch ||  || align=right data-sort-value="0.59" | 590 m || 
|-id=652 bgcolor=#d6d6d6
| 518652 ||  || — || September 2, 2008 || Kitt Peak || Spacewatch ||  || align=right | 1.9 km || 
|-id=653 bgcolor=#E9E9E9
| 518653 ||  || — || September 3, 2008 || Kitt Peak || Spacewatch ||  || align=right | 1.9 km || 
|-id=654 bgcolor=#E9E9E9
| 518654 ||  || — || September 3, 2008 || Kitt Peak || Spacewatch ||  || align=right | 2.2 km || 
|-id=655 bgcolor=#d6d6d6
| 518655 ||  || — || September 4, 2008 || Kitt Peak || Spacewatch ||  || align=right | 2.4 km || 
|-id=656 bgcolor=#d6d6d6
| 518656 ||  || — || September 5, 2008 || Kitt Peak || Spacewatch ||  || align=right | 2.6 km || 
|-id=657 bgcolor=#E9E9E9
| 518657 ||  || — || September 7, 2008 || Mount Lemmon || Mount Lemmon Survey ||  || align=right | 2.0 km || 
|-id=658 bgcolor=#d6d6d6
| 518658 ||  || — || September 20, 2008 || Kitt Peak || Spacewatch ||  || align=right | 2.4 km || 
|-id=659 bgcolor=#d6d6d6
| 518659 ||  || — || September 24, 2008 || Mount Lemmon || Mount Lemmon Survey ||  || align=right | 3.4 km || 
|-id=660 bgcolor=#d6d6d6
| 518660 ||  || — || September 4, 2008 || Kitt Peak || Spacewatch ||  || align=right | 3.4 km || 
|-id=661 bgcolor=#d6d6d6
| 518661 ||  || — || September 20, 2008 || Kitt Peak || Spacewatch ||  || align=right | 3.1 km || 
|-id=662 bgcolor=#d6d6d6
| 518662 ||  || — || September 25, 2008 || Kitt Peak || Spacewatch || LIX || align=right | 2.5 km || 
|-id=663 bgcolor=#E9E9E9
| 518663 ||  || — || September 22, 2008 || Kitt Peak || Spacewatch ||  || align=right | 2.0 km || 
|-id=664 bgcolor=#E9E9E9
| 518664 ||  || — || September 22, 2008 || Mount Lemmon || Mount Lemmon Survey ||  || align=right | 2.0 km || 
|-id=665 bgcolor=#E9E9E9
| 518665 ||  || — || October 13, 2004 || Kitt Peak || Spacewatch ||  || align=right data-sort-value="0.67" | 670 m || 
|-id=666 bgcolor=#d6d6d6
| 518666 ||  || — || September 24, 2008 || Kitt Peak || Spacewatch ||  || align=right | 2.4 km || 
|-id=667 bgcolor=#E9E9E9
| 518667 ||  || — || September 24, 2008 || Kitt Peak || Spacewatch ||  || align=right | 2.2 km || 
|-id=668 bgcolor=#d6d6d6
| 518668 ||  || — || September 24, 2008 || Kitt Peak || Spacewatch ||  || align=right | 2.4 km || 
|-id=669 bgcolor=#E9E9E9
| 518669 ||  || — || September 24, 2008 || Kitt Peak || Spacewatch ||  || align=right | 1.4 km || 
|-id=670 bgcolor=#E9E9E9
| 518670 ||  || — || February 3, 2006 || Mount Lemmon || Mount Lemmon Survey ||  || align=right data-sort-value="0.98" | 980 m || 
|-id=671 bgcolor=#d6d6d6
| 518671 ||  || — || September 26, 2008 || Kitt Peak || Spacewatch ||  || align=right | 2.0 km || 
|-id=672 bgcolor=#d6d6d6
| 518672 ||  || — || October 6, 2008 || Mount Lemmon || Mount Lemmon Survey ||  || align=right | 2.9 km || 
|-id=673 bgcolor=#fefefe
| 518673 ||  || — || September 23, 2008 || Mount Lemmon || Mount Lemmon Survey ||  || align=right data-sort-value="0.75" | 750 m || 
|-id=674 bgcolor=#E9E9E9
| 518674 ||  || — || October 6, 2008 || Mount Lemmon || Mount Lemmon Survey ||  || align=right | 1.0 km || 
|-id=675 bgcolor=#E9E9E9
| 518675 ||  || — || October 8, 2008 || Mount Lemmon || Mount Lemmon Survey ||  || align=right | 1.7 km || 
|-id=676 bgcolor=#fefefe
| 518676 ||  || — || October 20, 2008 || Kitt Peak || Spacewatch ||  || align=right data-sort-value="0.69" | 690 m || 
|-id=677 bgcolor=#fefefe
| 518677 ||  || — || October 21, 2008 || Kitt Peak || Spacewatch || H || align=right data-sort-value="0.80" | 800 m || 
|-id=678 bgcolor=#FFC2E0
| 518678 ||  || — || October 28, 2008 || Socorro || LINEAR || APO +1kmPHAmoon || align=right | 1.1 km || 
|-id=679 bgcolor=#fefefe
| 518679 ||  || — || October 22, 2008 || Kitt Peak || Spacewatch || H || align=right data-sort-value="0.75" | 750 m || 
|-id=680 bgcolor=#fefefe
| 518680 ||  || — || September 21, 2008 || Kitt Peak || Spacewatch || MAS || align=right data-sort-value="0.70" | 700 m || 
|-id=681 bgcolor=#fefefe
| 518681 ||  || — || September 22, 2008 || Kitt Peak || Spacewatch || NYS || align=right data-sort-value="0.69" | 690 m || 
|-id=682 bgcolor=#fefefe
| 518682 ||  || — || October 10, 2008 || Catalina || CSS || H || align=right data-sort-value="0.62" | 620 m || 
|-id=683 bgcolor=#E9E9E9
| 518683 ||  || — || October 20, 2008 || Kitt Peak || Spacewatch ||  || align=right | 2.0 km || 
|-id=684 bgcolor=#E9E9E9
| 518684 ||  || — || October 20, 2008 || Kitt Peak || Spacewatch ||  || align=right | 1.9 km || 
|-id=685 bgcolor=#E9E9E9
| 518685 ||  || — || October 22, 2008 || Kitt Peak || Spacewatch ||  || align=right | 1.9 km || 
|-id=686 bgcolor=#E9E9E9
| 518686 ||  || — || October 25, 2008 || Kitt Peak || Spacewatch ||  || align=right | 1.6 km || 
|-id=687 bgcolor=#d6d6d6
| 518687 ||  || — || October 26, 2008 || Kitt Peak || Spacewatch ||  || align=right | 3.7 km || 
|-id=688 bgcolor=#d6d6d6
| 518688 ||  || — || November 9, 2008 || Kitt Peak || Spacewatch ||  || align=right | 1.9 km || 
|-id=689 bgcolor=#fefefe
| 518689 ||  || — || October 8, 2008 || Catalina || CSS || H || align=right data-sort-value="0.80" | 800 m || 
|-id=690 bgcolor=#fefefe
| 518690 ||  || — || October 27, 2008 || Kitt Peak || Spacewatch ||  || align=right data-sort-value="0.88" | 880 m || 
|-id=691 bgcolor=#E9E9E9
| 518691 ||  || — || November 18, 2008 || Kitt Peak || Spacewatch ||  || align=right | 1.1 km || 
|-id=692 bgcolor=#E9E9E9
| 518692 ||  || — || November 20, 2008 || Kitt Peak || Spacewatch ||  || align=right | 1.7 km || 
|-id=693 bgcolor=#d6d6d6
| 518693 ||  || — || November 30, 2008 || Kitt Peak || Spacewatch ||  || align=right | 2.7 km || 
|-id=694 bgcolor=#d6d6d6
| 518694 ||  || — || December 1, 2008 || Kitt Peak || Spacewatch ||  || align=right | 2.6 km || 
|-id=695 bgcolor=#E9E9E9
| 518695 ||  || — || December 30, 2008 || Mount Lemmon || Mount Lemmon Survey ||  || align=right | 1.1 km || 
|-id=696 bgcolor=#d6d6d6
| 518696 ||  || — || December 29, 2008 || Kitt Peak || Spacewatch || 7:4 || align=right | 4.3 km || 
|-id=697 bgcolor=#E9E9E9
| 518697 ||  || — || December 30, 2008 || Kitt Peak || Spacewatch ||  || align=right | 1.4 km || 
|-id=698 bgcolor=#d6d6d6
| 518698 ||  || — || October 7, 2007 || Mount Lemmon || Mount Lemmon Survey ||  || align=right | 2.2 km || 
|-id=699 bgcolor=#E9E9E9
| 518699 ||  || — || December 22, 2008 || Kitt Peak || Spacewatch ||  || align=right | 1.3 km || 
|-id=700 bgcolor=#d6d6d6
| 518700 ||  || — || December 22, 2008 || Mount Lemmon || Mount Lemmon Survey ||  || align=right | 2.9 km || 
|}

518701–518800 

|-bgcolor=#fefefe
| 518701 ||  || — || January 15, 2009 || Kitt Peak || Spacewatch ||  || align=right data-sort-value="0.95" | 950 m || 
|-id=702 bgcolor=#d6d6d6
| 518702 ||  || — || January 1, 2009 || Kitt Peak || Spacewatch ||  || align=right | 2.7 km || 
|-id=703 bgcolor=#E9E9E9
| 518703 ||  || — || January 1, 2009 || Kitt Peak || Spacewatch ||  || align=right | 1.2 km || 
|-id=704 bgcolor=#d6d6d6
| 518704 ||  || — || January 1, 2009 || Kitt Peak || Spacewatch ||  || align=right | 2.9 km || 
|-id=705 bgcolor=#d6d6d6
| 518705 ||  || — || January 2, 2009 || Kitt Peak || Spacewatch ||  || align=right | 2.5 km || 
|-id=706 bgcolor=#E9E9E9
| 518706 ||  || — || January 2, 2009 || Kitt Peak || Spacewatch ||  || align=right | 1.5 km || 
|-id=707 bgcolor=#E9E9E9
| 518707 ||  || — || January 18, 2009 || Kitt Peak || Spacewatch ||  || align=right | 1.2 km || 
|-id=708 bgcolor=#E9E9E9
| 518708 ||  || — || November 24, 2008 || Mount Lemmon || Mount Lemmon Survey ||  || align=right | 1.8 km || 
|-id=709 bgcolor=#E9E9E9
| 518709 ||  || — || January 20, 2009 || Kitt Peak || Spacewatch ||  || align=right | 1.2 km || 
|-id=710 bgcolor=#E9E9E9
| 518710 ||  || — || January 30, 2009 || Mount Lemmon || Mount Lemmon Survey || ADE || align=right | 1.5 km || 
|-id=711 bgcolor=#E9E9E9
| 518711 ||  || — || January 26, 2009 || Socorro || LINEAR ||  || align=right | 1.7 km || 
|-id=712 bgcolor=#d6d6d6
| 518712 ||  || — || January 25, 2009 || Kitt Peak || Spacewatch ||  || align=right | 3.0 km || 
|-id=713 bgcolor=#E9E9E9
| 518713 ||  || — || February 5, 2009 || Kitt Peak || Spacewatch ||  || align=right | 1.6 km || 
|-id=714 bgcolor=#d6d6d6
| 518714 ||  || — || February 3, 2009 || Kitt Peak || Spacewatch ||  || align=right | 2.3 km || 
|-id=715 bgcolor=#fefefe
| 518715 ||  || — || February 5, 2009 || Kitt Peak || Spacewatch ||  || align=right data-sort-value="0.67" | 670 m || 
|-id=716 bgcolor=#E9E9E9
| 518716 ||  || — || April 4, 2005 || Catalina || CSS ||  || align=right | 2.0 km || 
|-id=717 bgcolor=#FA8072
| 518717 ||  || — || February 20, 2009 || Kitt Peak || Spacewatch ||  || align=right | 1.3 km || 
|-id=718 bgcolor=#E9E9E9
| 518718 ||  || — || January 18, 2009 || Kitt Peak || Spacewatch ||  || align=right | 1.5 km || 
|-id=719 bgcolor=#E9E9E9
| 518719 ||  || — || January 18, 2009 || Mount Lemmon || Mount Lemmon Survey || JUN || align=right data-sort-value="0.90" | 900 m || 
|-id=720 bgcolor=#E9E9E9
| 518720 ||  || — || January 20, 2009 || Kitt Peak || Spacewatch ||  || align=right | 1.7 km || 
|-id=721 bgcolor=#E9E9E9
| 518721 ||  || — || January 18, 2009 || Kitt Peak || Spacewatch ||  || align=right data-sort-value="0.76" | 760 m || 
|-id=722 bgcolor=#d6d6d6
| 518722 ||  || — || January 18, 2009 || Kitt Peak || Spacewatch ||  || align=right | 2.7 km || 
|-id=723 bgcolor=#d6d6d6
| 518723 ||  || — || February 20, 2009 || Kitt Peak || Spacewatch ||  || align=right | 3.0 km || 
|-id=724 bgcolor=#E9E9E9
| 518724 ||  || — || February 20, 2009 || Kitt Peak || Spacewatch ||  || align=right | 1.1 km || 
|-id=725 bgcolor=#d6d6d6
| 518725 ||  || — || July 5, 2005 || Kitt Peak || Spacewatch ||  || align=right | 2.4 km || 
|-id=726 bgcolor=#E9E9E9
| 518726 ||  || — || March 2, 2009 || Mount Lemmon || Mount Lemmon Survey ||  || align=right | 2.2 km || 
|-id=727 bgcolor=#E9E9E9
| 518727 ||  || — || March 16, 2009 || Kitt Peak || Spacewatch ||  || align=right | 1.5 km || 
|-id=728 bgcolor=#E9E9E9
| 518728 ||  || — || March 19, 2009 || Kitt Peak || Spacewatch ||  || align=right | 1.5 km || 
|-id=729 bgcolor=#E9E9E9
| 518729 ||  || — || March 31, 2009 || Mount Lemmon || Mount Lemmon Survey ||  || align=right | 1.3 km || 
|-id=730 bgcolor=#E9E9E9
| 518730 ||  || — || March 19, 2009 || Kitt Peak || Spacewatch ||  || align=right | 1.7 km || 
|-id=731 bgcolor=#fefefe
| 518731 ||  || — || February 2, 2005 || Kitt Peak || Spacewatch ||  || align=right data-sort-value="0.82" | 820 m || 
|-id=732 bgcolor=#E9E9E9
| 518732 ||  || — || April 1, 2009 || Catalina || CSS ||  || align=right | 2.4 km || 
|-id=733 bgcolor=#E9E9E9
| 518733 ||  || — || March 29, 2009 || Mount Lemmon || Mount Lemmon Survey ||  || align=right | 1.9 km || 
|-id=734 bgcolor=#E9E9E9
| 518734 ||  || — || April 17, 2009 || Kitt Peak || Spacewatch ||  || align=right | 1.5 km || 
|-id=735 bgcolor=#FFC2E0
| 518735 ||  || — || May 5, 2009 || Kitt Peak || Spacewatch || APOcritical || align=right data-sort-value="0.21" | 210 m || 
|-id=736 bgcolor=#E9E9E9
| 518736 ||  || — || February 28, 2008 || Mount Lemmon || Mount Lemmon Survey ||  || align=right | 2.4 km || 
|-id=737 bgcolor=#FFC2E0
| 518737 ||  || — || July 29, 2009 || Cerro Burek || Alianza S4 Obs. || APO || align=right data-sort-value="0.58" | 580 m || 
|-id=738 bgcolor=#E9E9E9
| 518738 ||  || — || August 15, 2009 || Catalina || CSS ||  || align=right | 2.4 km || 
|-id=739 bgcolor=#fefefe
| 518739 ||  || — || April 1, 2008 || Mount Lemmon || Mount Lemmon Survey ||  || align=right data-sort-value="0.69" | 690 m || 
|-id=740 bgcolor=#E9E9E9
| 518740 ||  || — || August 15, 2009 || Kitt Peak || Spacewatch ||  || align=right | 2.3 km || 
|-id=741 bgcolor=#d6d6d6
| 518741 ||  || — || October 9, 2004 || Kitt Peak || Spacewatch ||  || align=right | 2.5 km || 
|-id=742 bgcolor=#d6d6d6
| 518742 ||  || — || August 18, 2009 || Kitt Peak || Spacewatch ||  || align=right | 2.7 km || 
|-id=743 bgcolor=#d6d6d6
| 518743 ||  || — || March 16, 2007 || Mount Lemmon || Mount Lemmon Survey ||  || align=right | 1.9 km || 
|-id=744 bgcolor=#fefefe
| 518744 ||  || — || September 15, 2009 || Kitt Peak || Spacewatch ||  || align=right data-sort-value="0.63" | 630 m || 
|-id=745 bgcolor=#E9E9E9
| 518745 ||  || — || September 15, 2009 || Kitt Peak || Spacewatch ||  || align=right | 1.0 km || 
|-id=746 bgcolor=#d6d6d6
| 518746 ||  || — || September 17, 2009 || Kitt Peak || Spacewatch ||  || align=right | 2.4 km || 
|-id=747 bgcolor=#d6d6d6
| 518747 ||  || — || September 18, 2009 || Mount Lemmon || Mount Lemmon Survey ||  || align=right | 2.6 km || 
|-id=748 bgcolor=#d6d6d6
| 518748 ||  || — || September 21, 2009 || Mount Lemmon || Mount Lemmon Survey ||  || align=right | 2.1 km || 
|-id=749 bgcolor=#d6d6d6
| 518749 ||  || — || September 21, 2009 || Kitt Peak || Spacewatch ||  || align=right | 2.6 km || 
|-id=750 bgcolor=#d6d6d6
| 518750 ||  || — || September 16, 2009 || Catalina || CSS ||  || align=right | 3.6 km || 
|-id=751 bgcolor=#d6d6d6
| 518751 ||  || — || September 22, 2009 || La Sagra || OAM Obs. ||  || align=right | 4.4 km || 
|-id=752 bgcolor=#E9E9E9
| 518752 ||  || — || September 24, 2009 || Mount Lemmon || Mount Lemmon Survey ||  || align=right data-sort-value="0.72" | 720 m || 
|-id=753 bgcolor=#E9E9E9
| 518753 ||  || — || September 26, 2009 || Kitt Peak || Spacewatch ||  || align=right data-sort-value="0.63" | 630 m || 
|-id=754 bgcolor=#d6d6d6
| 518754 ||  || — || October 8, 2004 || Kitt Peak || Spacewatch ||  || align=right | 3.2 km || 
|-id=755 bgcolor=#d6d6d6
| 518755 ||  || — || September 28, 2009 || Mount Lemmon || Mount Lemmon Survey ||  || align=right | 2.6 km || 
|-id=756 bgcolor=#d6d6d6
| 518756 ||  || — || September 25, 2009 || Catalina || CSS ||  || align=right | 3.3 km || 
|-id=757 bgcolor=#d6d6d6
| 518757 ||  || — || May 7, 2008 || Mount Lemmon || Mount Lemmon Survey ||  || align=right | 2.6 km || 
|-id=758 bgcolor=#d6d6d6
| 518758 ||  || — || October 15, 2009 || Mount Lemmon || Mount Lemmon Survey ||  || align=right | 3.8 km || 
|-id=759 bgcolor=#E9E9E9
| 518759 ||  || — || September 30, 2005 || Mount Lemmon || Mount Lemmon Survey ||  || align=right data-sort-value="0.80" | 800 m || 
|-id=760 bgcolor=#d6d6d6
| 518760 ||  || — || September 28, 2009 || Mount Lemmon || Mount Lemmon Survey ||  || align=right | 2.4 km || 
|-id=761 bgcolor=#d6d6d6
| 518761 ||  || — || October 26, 2009 || Mount Lemmon || Mount Lemmon Survey ||  || align=right | 2.4 km || 
|-id=762 bgcolor=#d6d6d6
| 518762 ||  || — || October 23, 2009 || Mount Lemmon || Mount Lemmon Survey ||  || align=right | 2.9 km || 
|-id=763 bgcolor=#d6d6d6
| 518763 ||  || — || October 24, 2009 || Kitt Peak || Spacewatch ||  || align=right | 4.8 km || 
|-id=764 bgcolor=#d6d6d6
| 518764 ||  || — || May 11, 2007 || Mount Lemmon || Mount Lemmon Survey ||  || align=right | 2.6 km || 
|-id=765 bgcolor=#E9E9E9
| 518765 ||  || — || October 24, 2009 || Kitt Peak || Spacewatch ||  || align=right | 1.5 km || 
|-id=766 bgcolor=#E9E9E9
| 518766 ||  || — || December 2, 2005 || Mount Lemmon || Mount Lemmon Survey ||  || align=right | 1.4 km || 
|-id=767 bgcolor=#E9E9E9
| 518767 ||  || — || October 26, 2009 || Kitt Peak || Spacewatch ||  || align=right | 2.0 km || 
|-id=768 bgcolor=#E9E9E9
| 518768 ||  || — || October 27, 2009 || Mount Lemmon || Mount Lemmon Survey ||  || align=right | 1.5 km || 
|-id=769 bgcolor=#fefefe
| 518769 ||  || — || November 9, 2009 || Catalina || CSS ||  || align=right data-sort-value="0.64" | 640 m || 
|-id=770 bgcolor=#d6d6d6
| 518770 ||  || — || November 9, 2009 || Kitt Peak || Spacewatch ||  || align=right | 2.9 km || 
|-id=771 bgcolor=#FFC2E0
| 518771 ||  || — || November 17, 2009 || Socorro || LINEAR || AMO || align=right data-sort-value="0.69" | 690 m || 
|-id=772 bgcolor=#fefefe
| 518772 ||  || — || November 18, 2009 || Kitt Peak || Spacewatch || V || align=right data-sort-value="0.60" | 600 m || 
|-id=773 bgcolor=#d6d6d6
| 518773 ||  || — || October 16, 2009 || Mount Lemmon || Mount Lemmon Survey ||  || align=right | 2.9 km || 
|-id=774 bgcolor=#d6d6d6
| 518774 ||  || — || September 22, 2009 || Mount Lemmon || Mount Lemmon Survey ||  || align=right | 2.7 km || 
|-id=775 bgcolor=#fefefe
| 518775 ||  || — || November 9, 2009 || Kitt Peak || Spacewatch ||  || align=right data-sort-value="0.94" | 940 m || 
|-id=776 bgcolor=#E9E9E9
| 518776 ||  || — || November 24, 2009 || Kitt Peak || Spacewatch ||  || align=right | 1.5 km || 
|-id=777 bgcolor=#E9E9E9
| 518777 ||  || — || November 25, 2009 || Kitt Peak || Spacewatch ||  || align=right | 1.9 km || 
|-id=778 bgcolor=#d6d6d6
| 518778 ||  || — || April 16, 2004 || Kitt Peak || Spacewatch ||  || align=right | 4.6 km || 
|-id=779 bgcolor=#E9E9E9
| 518779 ||  || — || October 16, 2009 || Catalina || CSS ||  || align=right | 4.1 km || 
|-id=780 bgcolor=#E9E9E9
| 518780 ||  || — || January 15, 2010 || WISE || WISE ||  || align=right | 2.5 km || 
|-id=781 bgcolor=#d6d6d6
| 518781 ||  || — || January 15, 2010 || WISE || WISE ||  || align=right | 4.2 km || 
|-id=782 bgcolor=#d6d6d6
| 518782 ||  || — || January 8, 2010 || Kitt Peak || Spacewatch ||  || align=right | 2.3 km || 
|-id=783 bgcolor=#E9E9E9
| 518783 ||  || — || December 20, 2009 || Kitt Peak || Spacewatch ||  || align=right | 1.5 km || 
|-id=784 bgcolor=#E9E9E9
| 518784 ||  || — || February 25, 2006 || Kitt Peak || Spacewatch ||  || align=right | 2.0 km || 
|-id=785 bgcolor=#d6d6d6
| 518785 ||  || — || September 14, 2007 || Mount Lemmon || Mount Lemmon Survey ||  || align=right | 2.4 km || 
|-id=786 bgcolor=#d6d6d6
| 518786 ||  || — || January 17, 2010 || WISE || WISE ||  || align=right | 3.4 km || 
|-id=787 bgcolor=#d6d6d6
| 518787 ||  || — || July 29, 2008 || Kitt Peak || Spacewatch || 7:4 || align=right | 4.3 km || 
|-id=788 bgcolor=#d6d6d6
| 518788 ||  || — || September 27, 2009 || Mount Lemmon || Mount Lemmon Survey ||  || align=right | 4.1 km || 
|-id=789 bgcolor=#E9E9E9
| 518789 ||  || — || January 20, 2010 || WISE || WISE ||  || align=right | 2.4 km || 
|-id=790 bgcolor=#d6d6d6
| 518790 ||  || — || January 20, 2010 || WISE || WISE ||  || align=right | 2.7 km || 
|-id=791 bgcolor=#E9E9E9
| 518791 ||  || — || September 27, 2009 || Mount Lemmon || Mount Lemmon Survey ||  || align=right | 2.3 km || 
|-id=792 bgcolor=#E9E9E9
| 518792 ||  || — || January 22, 2010 || WISE || WISE ||  || align=right | 2.6 km || 
|-id=793 bgcolor=#E9E9E9
| 518793 ||  || — || October 24, 2008 || Kitt Peak || Spacewatch ||  || align=right | 2.0 km || 
|-id=794 bgcolor=#E9E9E9
| 518794 ||  || — || February 9, 2005 || Kitt Peak || Spacewatch ||  || align=right | 2.8 km || 
|-id=795 bgcolor=#d6d6d6
| 518795 ||  || — || January 25, 2010 || WISE || WISE ||  || align=right | 2.5 km || 
|-id=796 bgcolor=#d6d6d6
| 518796 ||  || — || February 1, 2006 || Kitt Peak || Spacewatch ||  || align=right | 2.4 km || 
|-id=797 bgcolor=#d6d6d6
| 518797 ||  || — || January 26, 2010 || WISE || WISE ||  || align=right | 2.6 km || 
|-id=798 bgcolor=#d6d6d6
| 518798 ||  || — || January 27, 2010 || WISE || WISE || 7:4 || align=right | 4.3 km || 
|-id=799 bgcolor=#E9E9E9
| 518799 ||  || — || December 6, 2005 || Kitt Peak || Spacewatch ||  || align=right | 2.7 km || 
|-id=800 bgcolor=#d6d6d6
| 518800 ||  || — || August 13, 1999 || Kitt Peak || Spacewatch || 7:4 || align=right | 5.3 km || 
|}

518801–518900 

|-bgcolor=#E9E9E9
| 518801 ||  || — || January 27, 2010 || WISE || WISE ||  || align=right | 1.6 km || 
|-id=802 bgcolor=#d6d6d6
| 518802 ||  || — || January 27, 2010 || WISE || WISE ||  || align=right | 3.6 km || 
|-id=803 bgcolor=#d6d6d6
| 518803 ||  || — || October 14, 2009 || Mount Lemmon || Mount Lemmon Survey ||  || align=right | 3.2 km || 
|-id=804 bgcolor=#d6d6d6
| 518804 ||  || — || January 29, 2010 || WISE || WISE ||  || align=right | 4.0 km || 
|-id=805 bgcolor=#d6d6d6
| 518805 ||  || — || December 16, 2004 || Kitt Peak || Spacewatch ||  || align=right | 3.7 km || 
|-id=806 bgcolor=#d6d6d6
| 518806 ||  || — || January 31, 2010 || WISE || WISE ||  || align=right | 4.4 km || 
|-id=807 bgcolor=#d6d6d6
| 518807 ||  || — || January 31, 2010 || WISE || WISE ||  || align=right | 3.9 km || 
|-id=808 bgcolor=#d6d6d6
| 518808 ||  || — || February 7, 2010 || WISE || WISE ||  || align=right | 3.5 km || 
|-id=809 bgcolor=#d6d6d6
| 518809 ||  || — || February 10, 2010 || WISE || WISE ||  || align=right | 4.8 km || 
|-id=810 bgcolor=#FFC2E0
| 518810 ||  || — || February 14, 2010 || Socorro || LINEAR || APOPHA || align=right data-sort-value="0.083" | 83 m || 
|-id=811 bgcolor=#d6d6d6
| 518811 ||  || — || January 6, 2010 || Kitt Peak || Spacewatch ||  || align=right | 3.3 km || 
|-id=812 bgcolor=#d6d6d6
| 518812 ||  || — || February 11, 2010 || WISE || WISE ||  || align=right | 3.8 km || 
|-id=813 bgcolor=#E9E9E9
| 518813 ||  || — || February 12, 2010 || WISE || WISE ||  || align=right | 2.5 km || 
|-id=814 bgcolor=#fefefe
| 518814 ||  || — || February 12, 2010 || WISE || WISE ||  || align=right | 3.4 km || 
|-id=815 bgcolor=#d6d6d6
| 518815 ||  || — || November 25, 2009 || Mount Lemmon || Mount Lemmon Survey ||  || align=right | 3.6 km || 
|-id=816 bgcolor=#d6d6d6
| 518816 ||  || — || February 14, 2010 || WISE || WISE ||  || align=right | 3.6 km || 
|-id=817 bgcolor=#d6d6d6
| 518817 ||  || — || May 26, 2006 || Mount Lemmon || Mount Lemmon Survey ||  || align=right | 4.3 km || 
|-id=818 bgcolor=#d6d6d6
| 518818 ||  || — || February 14, 2010 || Mount Lemmon || Mount Lemmon Survey ||  || align=right | 2.4 km || 
|-id=819 bgcolor=#d6d6d6
| 518819 ||  || — || February 14, 2010 || Mount Lemmon || Mount Lemmon Survey ||  || align=right | 2.9 km || 
|-id=820 bgcolor=#d6d6d6
| 518820 ||  || — || February 14, 2010 || Mount Lemmon || Mount Lemmon Survey ||  || align=right | 3.1 km || 
|-id=821 bgcolor=#fefefe
| 518821 ||  || — || February 5, 2010 || Kitt Peak || Spacewatch || V || align=right data-sort-value="0.57" | 570 m || 
|-id=822 bgcolor=#E9E9E9
| 518822 ||  || — || February 10, 2010 || WISE || WISE ||  || align=right | 1.9 km || 
|-id=823 bgcolor=#d6d6d6
| 518823 ||  || — || February 15, 2010 || WISE || WISE ||  || align=right | 3.6 km || 
|-id=824 bgcolor=#E9E9E9
| 518824 ||  || — || February 20, 2006 || Kitt Peak || Spacewatch ||  || align=right | 1.4 km || 
|-id=825 bgcolor=#d6d6d6
| 518825 ||  || — || February 9, 2010 || Mount Lemmon || Mount Lemmon Survey ||  || align=right | 2.0 km || 
|-id=826 bgcolor=#fefefe
| 518826 ||  || — || February 14, 2010 || Haleakala || Pan-STARRS || NYS || align=right data-sort-value="0.60" | 600 m || 
|-id=827 bgcolor=#d6d6d6
| 518827 ||  || — || November 2, 2008 || Kitt Peak || Spacewatch ||  || align=right | 2.6 km || 
|-id=828 bgcolor=#d6d6d6
| 518828 ||  || — || February 5, 2010 || Catalina || CSS ||  || align=right | 3.9 km || 
|-id=829 bgcolor=#d6d6d6
| 518829 ||  || — || February 11, 2010 || WISE || WISE ||  || align=right | 3.2 km || 
|-id=830 bgcolor=#d6d6d6
| 518830 ||  || — || February 13, 2010 || WISE || WISE ||  || align=right | 3.8 km || 
|-id=831 bgcolor=#E9E9E9
| 518831 ||  || — || February 13, 2010 || WISE || WISE ||  || align=right | 1.8 km || 
|-id=832 bgcolor=#d6d6d6
| 518832 ||  || — || November 9, 2007 || Kitt Peak || Spacewatch ||  || align=right | 2.8 km || 
|-id=833 bgcolor=#d6d6d6
| 518833 ||  || — || February 20, 2006 || Kitt Peak || Spacewatch ||  || align=right | 2.9 km || 
|-id=834 bgcolor=#E9E9E9
| 518834 ||  || — || February 15, 2010 || WISE || WISE ||  || align=right | 1.4 km || 
|-id=835 bgcolor=#E9E9E9
| 518835 ||  || — || February 8, 2010 || WISE || WISE ||  || align=right | 2.5 km || 
|-id=836 bgcolor=#d6d6d6
| 518836 ||  || — || July 29, 2008 || Kitt Peak || Spacewatch || 7:4 || align=right | 2.5 km || 
|-id=837 bgcolor=#d6d6d6
| 518837 ||  || — || February 8, 2010 || WISE || WISE ||  || align=right | 2.2 km || 
|-id=838 bgcolor=#d6d6d6
| 518838 ||  || — || February 9, 2010 || WISE || WISE ||  || align=right | 2.5 km || 
|-id=839 bgcolor=#d6d6d6
| 518839 ||  || — || February 1, 2010 || WISE || WISE ||  || align=right | 5.2 km || 
|-id=840 bgcolor=#E9E9E9
| 518840 ||  || — || February 1, 2010 || WISE || WISE ||  || align=right | 3.3 km || 
|-id=841 bgcolor=#d6d6d6
| 518841 ||  || — || October 27, 2009 || Mount Lemmon || Mount Lemmon Survey ||  || align=right | 3.4 km || 
|-id=842 bgcolor=#d6d6d6
| 518842 ||  || — || April 25, 2007 || Kitt Peak || Spacewatch ||  || align=right | 3.9 km || 
|-id=843 bgcolor=#E9E9E9
| 518843 ||  || — || October 27, 2009 || Kitt Peak || Spacewatch ||  || align=right | 2.0 km || 
|-id=844 bgcolor=#d6d6d6
| 518844 ||  || — || February 2, 2010 || WISE || WISE ||  || align=right | 4.9 km || 
|-id=845 bgcolor=#fefefe
| 518845 ||  || — || February 9, 2010 || Catalina || CSS ||  || align=right data-sort-value="0.95" | 950 m || 
|-id=846 bgcolor=#d6d6d6
| 518846 ||  || — || October 5, 2007 || Kitt Peak || Spacewatch ||  || align=right | 2.7 km || 
|-id=847 bgcolor=#FFC2E0
| 518847 ||  || — || February 16, 2010 || Mount Lemmon || Mount Lemmon Survey || APOPHA || align=right data-sort-value="0.59" | 590 m || 
|-id=848 bgcolor=#d6d6d6
| 518848 ||  || — || February 16, 2010 || WISE || WISE ||  || align=right | 4.3 km || 
|-id=849 bgcolor=#d6d6d6
| 518849 ||  || — || February 16, 2010 || WISE || WISE ||  || align=right | 3.9 km || 
|-id=850 bgcolor=#d6d6d6
| 518850 ||  || — || February 16, 2010 || WISE || WISE ||  || align=right | 3.2 km || 
|-id=851 bgcolor=#d6d6d6
| 518851 ||  || — || February 19, 2010 || WISE || WISE ||  || align=right | 4.4 km || 
|-id=852 bgcolor=#d6d6d6
| 518852 ||  || — || February 19, 2010 || WISE || WISE ||  || align=right | 4.3 km || 
|-id=853 bgcolor=#d6d6d6
| 518853 ||  || — || September 30, 2003 || Kitt Peak || Spacewatch ||  || align=right | 3.3 km || 
|-id=854 bgcolor=#d6d6d6
| 518854 ||  || — || October 21, 2007 || Mount Lemmon || Mount Lemmon Survey ||  || align=right | 2.6 km || 
|-id=855 bgcolor=#d6d6d6
| 518855 ||  || — || July 16, 2005 || Kitt Peak || Spacewatch ||  || align=right | 2.6 km || 
|-id=856 bgcolor=#E9E9E9
| 518856 ||  || — || January 31, 2006 || Kitt Peak || Spacewatch ||  || align=right data-sort-value="0.82" | 820 m || 
|-id=857 bgcolor=#d6d6d6
| 518857 ||  || — || February 25, 2010 || WISE || WISE ||  || align=right | 4.6 km || 
|-id=858 bgcolor=#E9E9E9
| 518858 ||  || — || February 25, 2010 || WISE || WISE ||  || align=right | 3.1 km || 
|-id=859 bgcolor=#d6d6d6
| 518859 ||  || — || November 2, 2007 || Kitt Peak || Spacewatch ||  || align=right | 4.3 km || 
|-id=860 bgcolor=#d6d6d6
| 518860 ||  || — || February 20, 2009 || Mount Lemmon || Mount Lemmon Survey ||  || align=right | 5.1 km || 
|-id=861 bgcolor=#E9E9E9
| 518861 ||  || — || February 27, 2010 || WISE || WISE ||  || align=right | 1.8 km || 
|-id=862 bgcolor=#E9E9E9
| 518862 ||  || — || November 27, 2009 || Mount Lemmon || Mount Lemmon Survey ||  || align=right | 2.5 km || 
|-id=863 bgcolor=#E9E9E9
| 518863 ||  || — || February 28, 2010 || WISE || WISE ||  || align=right | 1.5 km || 
|-id=864 bgcolor=#d6d6d6
| 518864 ||  || — || September 23, 2008 || Kitt Peak || Spacewatch ||  || align=right | 2.2 km || 
|-id=865 bgcolor=#E9E9E9
| 518865 ||  || — || February 26, 2010 || WISE || WISE ||  || align=right | 4.0 km || 
|-id=866 bgcolor=#E9E9E9
| 518866 ||  || — || September 28, 2011 || Mount Lemmon || Mount Lemmon Survey ||  || align=right | 2.0 km || 
|-id=867 bgcolor=#E9E9E9
| 518867 ||  || — || November 17, 2009 || Kitt Peak || Spacewatch ||  || align=right | 2.2 km || 
|-id=868 bgcolor=#d6d6d6
| 518868 ||  || — || December 10, 2009 || Mount Lemmon || Mount Lemmon Survey ||  || align=right | 2.0 km || 
|-id=869 bgcolor=#E9E9E9
| 518869 ||  || — || January 9, 2006 || Kitt Peak || Spacewatch ||  || align=right | 1.7 km || 
|-id=870 bgcolor=#E9E9E9
| 518870 ||  || — || December 11, 2009 || Mount Lemmon || Mount Lemmon Survey ||  || align=right | 2.4 km || 
|-id=871 bgcolor=#E9E9E9
| 518871 ||  || — || September 27, 2008 || Mount Lemmon || Mount Lemmon Survey ||  || align=right | 1.9 km || 
|-id=872 bgcolor=#E9E9E9
| 518872 ||  || — || February 17, 2010 || Kitt Peak || Spacewatch ||  || align=right | 1.1 km || 
|-id=873 bgcolor=#E9E9E9
| 518873 ||  || — || February 19, 2010 || Kitt Peak || Spacewatch ||  || align=right data-sort-value="0.90" | 900 m || 
|-id=874 bgcolor=#d6d6d6
| 518874 ||  || — || January 7, 2014 || Mount Lemmon || Mount Lemmon Survey ||  || align=right | 4.0 km || 
|-id=875 bgcolor=#d6d6d6
| 518875 ||  || — || September 26, 2006 || Kitt Peak || Spacewatch ||  || align=right | 3.0 km || 
|-id=876 bgcolor=#E9E9E9
| 518876 ||  || — || March 12, 2010 || Catalina || CSS ||  || align=right | 1.5 km || 
|-id=877 bgcolor=#fefefe
| 518877 ||  || — || February 19, 2010 || Mount Lemmon || Mount Lemmon Survey ||  || align=right data-sort-value="0.89" | 890 m || 
|-id=878 bgcolor=#d6d6d6
| 518878 ||  || — || March 12, 2010 || Mount Lemmon || Mount Lemmon Survey ||  || align=right | 2.2 km || 
|-id=879 bgcolor=#d6d6d6
| 518879 ||  || — || March 12, 2010 || WISE || WISE ||  || align=right | 3.6 km || 
|-id=880 bgcolor=#d6d6d6
| 518880 ||  || — || April 17, 2005 || Kitt Peak || Spacewatch ||  || align=right | 2.4 km || 
|-id=881 bgcolor=#d6d6d6
| 518881 ||  || — || March 13, 2010 || Mount Lemmon || Mount Lemmon Survey ||  || align=right | 2.1 km || 
|-id=882 bgcolor=#d6d6d6
| 518882 ||  || — || September 4, 2008 || Kitt Peak || Spacewatch ||  || align=right | 2.9 km || 
|-id=883 bgcolor=#d6d6d6
| 518883 ||  || — || March 9, 2010 || WISE || WISE ||  || align=right | 3.9 km || 
|-id=884 bgcolor=#d6d6d6
| 518884 ||  || — || September 26, 2006 || Mount Lemmon || Mount Lemmon Survey ||  || align=right | 2.4 km || 
|-id=885 bgcolor=#d6d6d6
| 518885 ||  || — || March 12, 2010 || WISE || WISE ||  || align=right | 3.3 km || 
|-id=886 bgcolor=#d6d6d6
| 518886 Wheelock ||  ||  || March 13, 2010 || WISE || WISE ||  || align=right | 4.3 km || 
|-id=887 bgcolor=#d6d6d6
| 518887 ||  || — || December 17, 2009 || Mount Lemmon || Mount Lemmon Survey ||  || align=right | 2.5 km || 
|-id=888 bgcolor=#d6d6d6
| 518888 ||  || — || December 11, 2009 || Mount Lemmon || Mount Lemmon Survey ||  || align=right | 2.2 km || 
|-id=889 bgcolor=#d6d6d6
| 518889 ||  || — || April 30, 2006 || Catalina || CSS ||  || align=right | 3.6 km || 
|-id=890 bgcolor=#E9E9E9
| 518890 ||  || — || January 23, 2006 || Kitt Peak || Spacewatch ||  || align=right | 3.8 km || 
|-id=891 bgcolor=#d6d6d6
| 518891 ||  || — || January 4, 2010 || Kitt Peak || Spacewatch ||  || align=right | 4.5 km || 
|-id=892 bgcolor=#d6d6d6
| 518892 ||  || — || February 18, 2010 || Mount Lemmon || Mount Lemmon Survey || 7:4 || align=right | 2.6 km || 
|-id=893 bgcolor=#d6d6d6
| 518893 ||  || — || March 11, 2011 || Catalina || CSS ||  || align=right | 3.8 km || 
|-id=894 bgcolor=#d6d6d6
| 518894 ||  || — || March 18, 2010 || WISE || WISE ||  || align=right | 3.9 km || 
|-id=895 bgcolor=#d6d6d6
| 518895 ||  || — || September 29, 2008 || Mount Lemmon || Mount Lemmon Survey ||  || align=right | 2.9 km || 
|-id=896 bgcolor=#d6d6d6
| 518896 ||  || — || April 2, 2009 || Mount Lemmon || Mount Lemmon Survey ||  || align=right | 3.7 km || 
|-id=897 bgcolor=#d6d6d6
| 518897 ||  || — || October 9, 2008 || Mount Lemmon || Mount Lemmon Survey ||  || align=right | 3.6 km || 
|-id=898 bgcolor=#d6d6d6
| 518898 ||  || — || December 14, 2007 || Mount Lemmon || Mount Lemmon Survey ||  || align=right | 3.7 km || 
|-id=899 bgcolor=#d6d6d6
| 518899 ||  || — || December 31, 2008 || Kitt Peak || Spacewatch ||  || align=right | 3.2 km || 
|-id=900 bgcolor=#d6d6d6
| 518900 ||  || — || December 17, 2009 || Kitt Peak || Spacewatch ||  || align=right | 4.3 km || 
|}

518901–519000 

|-bgcolor=#d6d6d6
| 518901 ||  || — || March 30, 2010 || WISE || WISE ||  || align=right | 2.7 km || 
|-id=902 bgcolor=#d6d6d6
| 518902 ||  || — || December 25, 2009 || Kitt Peak || Spacewatch ||  || align=right | 4.0 km || 
|-id=903 bgcolor=#E9E9E9
| 518903 ||  || — || February 2, 2006 || Catalina || CSS ||  || align=right | 2.8 km || 
|-id=904 bgcolor=#d6d6d6
| 518904 ||  || — || April 1, 2010 || WISE || WISE ||  || align=right | 5.2 km || 
|-id=905 bgcolor=#d6d6d6
| 518905 ||  || — || October 20, 2008 || Kitt Peak || Spacewatch ||  || align=right | 2.7 km || 
|-id=906 bgcolor=#d6d6d6
| 518906 ||  || — || August 28, 2006 || Kitt Peak || Spacewatch ||  || align=right | 3.0 km || 
|-id=907 bgcolor=#E9E9E9
| 518907 ||  || — || March 20, 2010 || WISE || WISE ||  || align=right | 3.4 km || 
|-id=908 bgcolor=#E9E9E9
| 518908 ||  || — || December 16, 2009 || Mount Lemmon || Mount Lemmon Survey ||  || align=right | 2.3 km || 
|-id=909 bgcolor=#d6d6d6
| 518909 ||  || — || September 23, 2008 || Kitt Peak || Spacewatch ||  || align=right | 3.2 km || 
|-id=910 bgcolor=#E9E9E9
| 518910 ||  || — || December 20, 2009 || Kitt Peak || Spacewatch ||  || align=right | 2.6 km || 
|-id=911 bgcolor=#d6d6d6
| 518911 ||  || — || March 16, 2004 || Kitt Peak || Spacewatch ||  || align=right | 2.9 km || 
|-id=912 bgcolor=#E9E9E9
| 518912 ||  || — || March 31, 2010 || WISE || WISE ||  || align=right | 3.0 km || 
|-id=913 bgcolor=#E9E9E9
| 518913 ||  || — || February 1, 2006 || Kitt Peak || Spacewatch ||  || align=right | 1.8 km || 
|-id=914 bgcolor=#E9E9E9
| 518914 ||  || — || April 30, 2005 || Kitt Peak || Spacewatch ||  || align=right | 2.3 km || 
|-id=915 bgcolor=#d6d6d6
| 518915 ||  || — || December 19, 2009 || Kitt Peak || Spacewatch ||  || align=right | 2.1 km || 
|-id=916 bgcolor=#E9E9E9
| 518916 ||  || — || February 1, 2005 || Kitt Peak || Spacewatch ||  || align=right | 2.7 km || 
|-id=917 bgcolor=#E9E9E9
| 518917 ||  || — || January 30, 2006 || Kitt Peak || Spacewatch ||  || align=right | 1.3 km || 
|-id=918 bgcolor=#d6d6d6
| 518918 ||  || — || March 4, 2005 || Kitt Peak || Spacewatch ||  || align=right | 2.1 km || 
|-id=919 bgcolor=#d6d6d6
| 518919 ||  || — || April 6, 2010 || WISE || WISE ||  || align=right | 2.8 km || 
|-id=920 bgcolor=#d6d6d6
| 518920 ||  || — || April 7, 2010 || WISE || WISE ||  || align=right | 4.0 km || 
|-id=921 bgcolor=#d6d6d6
| 518921 ||  || — || January 13, 2010 || Mount Lemmon || Mount Lemmon Survey || Tj (2.99) || align=right | 2.5 km || 
|-id=922 bgcolor=#d6d6d6
| 518922 ||  || — || February 19, 2010 || Catalina || CSS ||  || align=right | 4.8 km || 
|-id=923 bgcolor=#E9E9E9
| 518923 ||  || — || February 14, 2009 || Mount Lemmon || Mount Lemmon Survey ||  || align=right | 2.4 km || 
|-id=924 bgcolor=#d6d6d6
| 518924 ||  || — || March 4, 2005 || Kitt Peak || Spacewatch ||  || align=right | 3.3 km || 
|-id=925 bgcolor=#E9E9E9
| 518925 ||  || — || September 5, 2008 || Kitt Peak || Spacewatch ||  || align=right | 2.0 km || 
|-id=926 bgcolor=#d6d6d6
| 518926 ||  || — || December 20, 2009 || Kitt Peak || Spacewatch ||  || align=right | 3.2 km || 
|-id=927 bgcolor=#d6d6d6
| 518927 ||  || — || April 9, 2010 || WISE || WISE ||  || align=right | 2.9 km || 
|-id=928 bgcolor=#d6d6d6
| 518928 ||  || — || February 13, 2010 || Catalina || CSS ||  || align=right | 4.8 km || 
|-id=929 bgcolor=#E9E9E9
| 518929 ||  || — || April 10, 2010 || WISE || WISE ||  || align=right | 2.1 km || 
|-id=930 bgcolor=#d6d6d6
| 518930 ||  || — || October 22, 2003 || Kitt Peak || Spacewatch ||  || align=right | 2.3 km || 
|-id=931 bgcolor=#E9E9E9
| 518931 ||  || — || October 27, 2008 || Kitt Peak || Spacewatch ||  || align=right | 2.5 km || 
|-id=932 bgcolor=#d6d6d6
| 518932 ||  || — || April 13, 2010 || WISE || WISE ||  || align=right | 2.9 km || 
|-id=933 bgcolor=#E9E9E9
| 518933 ||  || — || April 14, 2010 || WISE || WISE ||  || align=right data-sort-value="0.94" | 940 m || 
|-id=934 bgcolor=#d6d6d6
| 518934 ||  || — || April 14, 2010 || WISE || WISE ||  || align=right | 2.6 km || 
|-id=935 bgcolor=#E9E9E9
| 518935 ||  || — || November 10, 2004 || Kitt Peak || Spacewatch ||  || align=right | 2.2 km || 
|-id=936 bgcolor=#E9E9E9
| 518936 ||  || — || April 6, 2010 || Kitt Peak || Spacewatch ||  || align=right | 1.5 km || 
|-id=937 bgcolor=#d6d6d6
| 518937 ||  || — || September 15, 2007 || Kitt Peak || Spacewatch ||  || align=right | 2.4 km || 
|-id=938 bgcolor=#fefefe
| 518938 ||  || — || March 5, 2006 || Kitt Peak || Spacewatch ||  || align=right data-sort-value="0.79" | 790 m || 
|-id=939 bgcolor=#E9E9E9
| 518939 ||  || — || April 10, 2010 || Kitt Peak || Spacewatch ||  || align=right data-sort-value="0.75" | 750 m || 
|-id=940 bgcolor=#d6d6d6
| 518940 ||  || — || November 8, 2007 || Kitt Peak || Spacewatch ||  || align=right | 3.5 km || 
|-id=941 bgcolor=#E9E9E9
| 518941 ||  || — || August 19, 2006 || Kitt Peak || Spacewatch ||  || align=right | 2.6 km || 
|-id=942 bgcolor=#E9E9E9
| 518942 ||  || — || April 15, 2010 || WISE || WISE ||  || align=right | 1.4 km || 
|-id=943 bgcolor=#d6d6d6
| 518943 ||  || — || October 21, 2006 || Kitt Peak || Spacewatch ||  || align=right | 3.6 km || 
|-id=944 bgcolor=#E9E9E9
| 518944 ||  || — || April 2, 2010 || WISE || WISE ||  || align=right | 3.3 km || 
|-id=945 bgcolor=#d6d6d6
| 518945 ||  || — || January 10, 2010 || Catalina || CSS ||  || align=right | 3.6 km || 
|-id=946 bgcolor=#d6d6d6
| 518946 ||  || — || March 14, 2010 || Mount Lemmon || Mount Lemmon Survey ||  || align=right | 2.8 km || 
|-id=947 bgcolor=#E9E9E9
| 518947 ||  || — || April 9, 2010 || Mount Lemmon || Mount Lemmon Survey ||  || align=right | 1.8 km || 
|-id=948 bgcolor=#d6d6d6
| 518948 ||  || — || August 23, 2007 || Kitt Peak || Spacewatch ||  || align=right | 3.4 km || 
|-id=949 bgcolor=#d6d6d6
| 518949 ||  || — || March 16, 2009 || Kitt Peak || Spacewatch ||  || align=right | 2.4 km || 
|-id=950 bgcolor=#d6d6d6
| 518950 ||  || — || January 15, 2010 || Kitt Peak || Spacewatch ||  || align=right | 4.1 km || 
|-id=951 bgcolor=#d6d6d6
| 518951 ||  || — || April 17, 2010 || WISE || WISE ||  || align=right | 4.1 km || 
|-id=952 bgcolor=#d6d6d6
| 518952 ||  || — || April 17, 2010 || WISE || WISE ||  || align=right | 3.2 km || 
|-id=953 bgcolor=#E9E9E9
| 518953 ||  || — || April 17, 2010 || WISE || WISE ||  || align=right | 1.2 km || 
|-id=954 bgcolor=#d6d6d6
| 518954 ||  || — || April 17, 2010 || WISE || WISE || critical || align=right | 2.3 km || 
|-id=955 bgcolor=#d6d6d6
| 518955 ||  || — || April 18, 2010 || WISE || WISE ||  || align=right | 3.8 km || 
|-id=956 bgcolor=#d6d6d6
| 518956 ||  || — || April 18, 2010 || WISE || WISE ||  || align=right | 2.8 km || 
|-id=957 bgcolor=#d6d6d6
| 518957 ||  || — || July 19, 2007 || Siding Spring || SSS ||  || align=right | 5.2 km || 
|-id=958 bgcolor=#E9E9E9
| 518958 ||  || — || April 19, 2010 || WISE || WISE ||  || align=right | 2.5 km || 
|-id=959 bgcolor=#d6d6d6
| 518959 ||  || — || October 23, 2008 || Kitt Peak || Spacewatch ||  || align=right | 4.3 km || 
|-id=960 bgcolor=#d6d6d6
| 518960 ||  || — || April 20, 2010 || WISE || WISE ||  || align=right | 3.3 km || 
|-id=961 bgcolor=#E9E9E9
| 518961 ||  || — || March 18, 2005 || Catalina || CSS ||  || align=right | 2.8 km || 
|-id=962 bgcolor=#d6d6d6
| 518962 ||  || — || April 21, 2009 || Mount Lemmon || Mount Lemmon Survey ||  || align=right | 4.2 km || 
|-id=963 bgcolor=#d6d6d6
| 518963 ||  || — || February 10, 2008 || Kitt Peak || Spacewatch ||  || align=right | 4.1 km || 
|-id=964 bgcolor=#E9E9E9
| 518964 ||  || — || March 15, 2009 || Kitt Peak || Spacewatch ||  || align=right | 2.1 km || 
|-id=965 bgcolor=#d6d6d6
| 518965 ||  || — || April 23, 2010 || WISE || WISE ||  || align=right | 2.0 km || 
|-id=966 bgcolor=#E9E9E9
| 518966 ||  || — || April 23, 2010 || WISE || WISE ||  || align=right | 2.9 km || 
|-id=967 bgcolor=#d6d6d6
| 518967 ||  || — || April 24, 2010 || WISE || WISE ||  || align=right | 3.1 km || 
|-id=968 bgcolor=#d6d6d6
| 518968 ||  || — || January 10, 2008 || Kitt Peak || Spacewatch ||  || align=right | 2.7 km || 
|-id=969 bgcolor=#d6d6d6
| 518969 ||  || — || April 24, 2010 || WISE || WISE ||  || align=right | 3.9 km || 
|-id=970 bgcolor=#d6d6d6
| 518970 ||  || — || April 24, 2010 || WISE || WISE ||  || align=right | 2.7 km || 
|-id=971 bgcolor=#E9E9E9
| 518971 ||  || — || September 6, 2008 || Mount Lemmon || Mount Lemmon Survey ||  || align=right | 2.4 km || 
|-id=972 bgcolor=#d6d6d6
| 518972 ||  || — || May 4, 2006 || Kitt Peak || Spacewatch ||  || align=right | 2.7 km || 
|-id=973 bgcolor=#d6d6d6
| 518973 ||  || — || April 13, 2005 || Kitt Peak || Spacewatch ||  || align=right | 5.1 km || 
|-id=974 bgcolor=#E9E9E9
| 518974 ||  || — || April 26, 2010 || WISE || WISE ||  || align=right | 2.3 km || 
|-id=975 bgcolor=#d6d6d6
| 518975 ||  || — || December 30, 2007 || Kitt Peak || Spacewatch ||  || align=right | 3.7 km || 
|-id=976 bgcolor=#E9E9E9
| 518976 ||  || — || April 27, 2010 || WISE || WISE ||  || align=right | 2.4 km || 
|-id=977 bgcolor=#d6d6d6
| 518977 ||  || — || December 20, 2009 || Mount Lemmon || Mount Lemmon Survey ||  || align=right | 4.5 km || 
|-id=978 bgcolor=#d6d6d6
| 518978 ||  || — || April 28, 2010 || WISE || WISE || Tj (2.99) || align=right | 2.6 km || 
|-id=979 bgcolor=#E9E9E9
| 518979 ||  || — || February 16, 2010 || Mount Lemmon || Mount Lemmon Survey ||  || align=right | 2.4 km || 
|-id=980 bgcolor=#d6d6d6
| 518980 ||  || — || September 26, 2008 || Kitt Peak || Spacewatch ||  || align=right | 3.6 km || 
|-id=981 bgcolor=#d6d6d6
| 518981 ||  || — || April 29, 2010 || WISE || WISE ||  || align=right | 3.2 km || 
|-id=982 bgcolor=#E9E9E9
| 518982 ||  || — || October 1, 2006 || Kitt Peak || Spacewatch ||  || align=right | 2.8 km || 
|-id=983 bgcolor=#fefefe
| 518983 ||  || — || April 20, 2010 || Kitt Peak || Spacewatch ||  || align=right data-sort-value="0.78" | 780 m || 
|-id=984 bgcolor=#E9E9E9
| 518984 ||  || — || September 23, 2006 || Kitt Peak || Spacewatch ||  || align=right | 2.6 km || 
|-id=985 bgcolor=#d6d6d6
| 518985 ||  || — || May 2, 2010 || WISE || WISE ||  || align=right | 2.3 km || 
|-id=986 bgcolor=#E9E9E9
| 518986 ||  || — || March 17, 2005 || Mount Lemmon || Mount Lemmon Survey ||  || align=right | 1.7 km || 
|-id=987 bgcolor=#d6d6d6
| 518987 ||  || — || May 2, 2010 || WISE || WISE ||  || align=right | 3.7 km || 
|-id=988 bgcolor=#d6d6d6
| 518988 ||  || — || November 18, 2006 || Kitt Peak || Spacewatch ||  || align=right | 4.3 km || 
|-id=989 bgcolor=#E9E9E9
| 518989 ||  || — || November 8, 2008 || Mount Lemmon || Mount Lemmon Survey ||  || align=right | 2.5 km || 
|-id=990 bgcolor=#d6d6d6
| 518990 ||  || — || January 12, 2010 || Mount Lemmon || Mount Lemmon Survey ||  || align=right | 4.1 km || 
|-id=991 bgcolor=#E9E9E9
| 518991 ||  || — || February 18, 2010 || Mount Lemmon || Mount Lemmon Survey ||  || align=right | 2.1 km || 
|-id=992 bgcolor=#d6d6d6
| 518992 ||  || — || September 20, 2006 || Catalina || CSS ||  || align=right | 2.8 km || 
|-id=993 bgcolor=#d6d6d6
| 518993 ||  || — || February 15, 2010 || Mount Lemmon || Mount Lemmon Survey ||  || align=right | 3.3 km || 
|-id=994 bgcolor=#d6d6d6
| 518994 ||  || — || February 17, 2010 || Catalina || CSS ||  || align=right | 4.5 km || 
|-id=995 bgcolor=#d6d6d6
| 518995 ||  || — || May 7, 2010 || WISE || WISE ||  || align=right | 3.7 km || 
|-id=996 bgcolor=#d6d6d6
| 518996 ||  || — || October 1, 2005 || Kitt Peak || Spacewatch ||  || align=right | 2.4 km || 
|-id=997 bgcolor=#d6d6d6
| 518997 ||  || — || May 8, 2010 || WISE || WISE ||  || align=right | 4.3 km || 
|-id=998 bgcolor=#d6d6d6
| 518998 ||  || — || October 7, 2005 || Kitt Peak || Spacewatch ||  || align=right | 2.5 km || 
|-id=999 bgcolor=#d6d6d6
| 518999 ||  || — || May 8, 2010 || WISE || WISE ||  || align=right | 3.2 km || 
|-id=000 bgcolor=#d6d6d6
| 519000 ||  || — || November 19, 2008 || Kitt Peak || Spacewatch ||  || align=right | 2.7 km || 
|}

References

External links 
 Discovery Circumstances: Numbered Minor Planets (515001)–(520000) (IAU Minor Planet Center)

0518